= POEMS syndrome =

Paraneoplastic syndrome

- Other names: Crow–Fukase syndrome, Osteosclerotic myeloma, PEP syndrome, Polyneuropathy-endocrinopathy-plasma cell dyscrasia syndrome, Takatsuki syndrome.
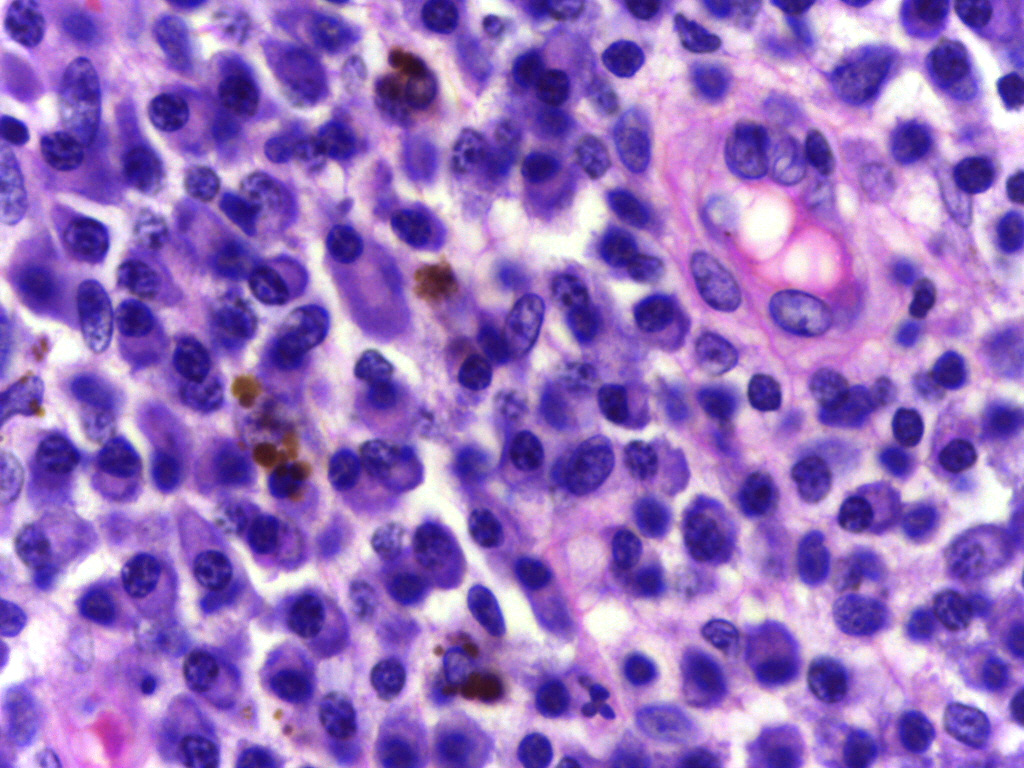
- Multiple myeloma is usually diagnosed because malignant plasma cells continue to produce an antibody that can be detected as a paraprotein.
- Specialty: Oncology
- Symptoms: Papilledema, polyneuropathy, edema, hyperpigmentation, hypogonadism, visceromegaly, amenorrhea, gynecomastia, erectile dysfunction, and testicular atrophy.
- Complications: Multiorgan failure, restrictive lung disease, pulmonary hypertension, cardiorespiratory failure, progressive inanition, infection, capillary leak-like syndrome, and renal failure.
- Usual onset: 5th to 6th decade of life.
- Duration: Chronic.
- Diagnostic method: Clinical Criteria.
- Differential diagnosis: Chronic inflammatory demyelinating polyradiculoneuropathy, cryoglobulinemia, nodular localized cutaneous amyloidosis, multiple myeloma, monoclonal gammopathy of undetermined significance, waldenstrom hypergammaglobulinemia, scleroderma, raynaud phenomenon, amyloid light chains (AL) amyloidosis, guillain-Barré syndrome.
- Treatment: Corticosteroids, low-dose alkylators, peripheral blood stem cell transplantation, high-dose chemotherapy.
- Medication: Thalidomide, lenalidomide, bortezomib, bevacizumab.
- Prognosis: Median survival of 13.8 years.
- Frequency: Rare

POEMS syndrome (also termed osteosclerotic myeloma, Crow–Fukase syndrome, Takatsuki disease, or PEP syndrome) is a rare paraneoplastic syndrome caused by a clone of aberrant plasma cells. The name POEMS is an acronym for some of the disease's major signs and symptoms (polyneuropathy, organomegaly, endocrinopathy, myeloma protein, and skin changes), as is PEP (polyneuropathy, endocrinopathy, plasma cell dyscrasia).

The signs and symptoms of most neoplasms (excessive, abnormal tissue growths) are due to their mass effects (compression of surrounding tissue by the mass of the growth) caused by the invasion and destruction of tissues by the neoplasms' cells. Signs and symptoms of a cancer causing a paraneoplastic syndrome result from the release of humoral factors such as hormones, cytokines, or immunoglobulins by the syndrome's neoplastic cells and/or the response of the immune system to the neoplasm. Many of the signs and symptoms in POEMS syndrome are due at least in part to the release of an aberrant immunoglobulin, i.e. a myeloma protein, as well as certain cytokines by the malignant plasma cells.

POEMS syndrome typically begins in middle age – the average age at onset is 50 – and affects up to twice as many men as women.

== Signs and symptoms ==
The signs and symptoms of POEMS syndrome are highly variable. This often leads to long delays (e.g. 13–18 months) between the onset of initial symptoms and diagnosis. In addition to the signs and symptoms indicated by the POEMS acronym, the PEST acronym is used to describe some of the other signs and symptoms of the disease. PEST stands for Papilledema, evidence of Extravascular volume overload (ascites, pleural effusion, pericardial effusion, and lower extremity edema), Sclerotic bone lesions, and Thrombocytosis/erythrocytosis (i.e. increased in blood platelets and red blood cells). Other features of the disease include a tendency toward leukocytosis, blood clot formation, abnormal lung function (restrictive lung disease, pulmonary hypertension, and impaired lung diffusion capacity), very high blood levels of the cytokine vascular endothelial growth factor (VEGF), and an overlap with the signs and symptoms of multicentric Castleman disease.

=== Common features ===
The more common features of the disease are summarized in the acronym POEMS: Papilledema (swelling of the optic disc) often but not always due to increased intracranial pressure) is the most common ocular sign of POEMS syndrome, occurring in ≥29% of cases. Less frequent ocular findings include cystoid macular edema, serous macular detachment, infiltrative orbitopathy, and venous sinus thrombosis. Some features have been observed in patients with POEMS syndrome but are not yet certain to form part of the syndrome itself. These include a predisposition to forming blood clots, joint pain, cardiomyopathy (systolic dysfunction), fever, low vitamin B12 levels, and diarrhea.

== Pathogenesis ==
While the main features of this paraneoplastic disease have been described, the exact mechanism behind its development, progression, and manifestations remain elusive. Overproduction of the myeloma protein and VEGF may underlie some, but are insufficient to explain all, of the multi-organ features of the disease. It is suggested that various other cytokines produced by the clonal plasma cells, perhaps working in concert with each other as well as with VEGF and the myeloma proteins, mediate many of the features of POEMS syndrome. The other cytokines detected in, and suspected of contributing to, POEMS syndrome include interleukin 1β, interleukin 6, and TNFα. Nonetheless, it seems likely that some of these paraneoplastic factors, operating individually, make a major contribution to certain features of the disease. For example, VEGF, given its ability to stimulate blood vessel formation, would seem likely to be the major contributor to the pathologic hyper-vascularization changes seem in many tissues, such as lymph nodes, affected by POEMS syndrome.

== Diagnosis ==
The diagnosis of POEMS syndrome is based on meeting its two mandatory criteria, meeting at least one of its 3 other major criteria, and meeting at least one of its 6 minor criteria.

=== Mandatory criteria ===
==== Polyneuropathy ====
Subacute, distal, symmetrical sensorimotor neuropathy with allodynia and hyperpathia is the most frequent presentation of POEMS syndrome. Neuropathy is often the first trait, and it may be the only initial symptom. Clinical examination may show distal wasting, weakness, and sensory impairment affecting both large and small fibre sensory modalities.

==== Plasma cell dyscrasia ====
Plasma cell dyscrasias are a group of monoclonal gammopathies in which normal plasma cells in the bone marrow and soft tissues become altered. POEMS syndrome is often associated with an IgA or IgG lambda limited plasma cell dysfunction. On iliac crest biopsies, patients with POEMS syndrome often have few monoclonal plasma cells. In patients with localized illness, iliac crest biopsies may be normal. Other common findings were megakaryocyte hyperplasia and clustering, as well as unusual megakaryocyte appearances. Atypical plasma cells invade normal marrow in osteosclerotic lesions, causing sclerosis of the bony lamellae.

=== Major criteria ===
==== Castleman's disease ====
Castleman's disease (CD) is a rare heterogeneous lymph node disorder characterized by elevated interleukin-6 levels. Neuropathy can occur in CD patients with or without POEMS syndrome. CD and POEMS tend to overlap, with roughly 15–24% of POEMS syndrome patients also having CD, with the majority having hyaline vascular type.

==== Sclerotic bone lesions ====
Osteosclerotic lesions have been documented in around 95% of patients. Bone lesions can be sclerotic, lytic with sclerotic rims, or a mixture of the two with a soup-bubble look. About half of the patients have a single bone lesion, whereas the other half have several lesions. The most prevalent locations for bone lesions are the pelvis, spine, ribs, and proximal extremities.

==== Vascular endothelial growth factor ====
VEGF levels in plasma and serum are significantly higher in POEMS patients and correlate with illness activity. Osteoblasts, bone tissue, macrophages, tumor cells, plasma cells, and megakaryocytes all express VEGF; both IL1 and IL6 have been proven to increase VEGF synthesis. VEGF normally targets endothelial cells and causes an increase in vascular permeability that is both fast and reversible. Increased VEGF could explain several clinical features of POEMS, including organomegaly, edema, skin abnormalities, and neuropathy, as well as increasing microvascular permeability of blood vessels with endoneurial edema.

=== Minor criteria ===
==== Organomegaly ====
POEMS syndrome has been associated with hepatomegaly, splenomegaly, and lymphadenopathy in 50–78% of patients. Organomegaly is usually minimal, and bulky disease is uncommon.

==== Extravascular volume overload ====
80% of POEMS patients are reported to have extravascular volume overload including, peripheral edema, ascites, pleural effusion, and pericardial effusion. Ascites and peripheral edema are more prevalent than pleural or pericardial effusions. Extravascular volume overload can cause significant morbidity and corresponds with a lower survival rate.

==== Endocrinopathy ====
Approximately 84% of POEMS syndrome patients have characteristics of several endocrinopathies. Hypogonadism is the most prevalent endocrine disorder, followed by thyroid anomalies, glucose metabolism defects, and adrenal insufficiency. Men frequently experience impotence and gynecomastia. Amenorrhea tends to be common in women. The cause of endocrinopathy is unknown, however VEGF may have a role.

==== Skin changes ====
About 90–100% of those with POEMS syndrome will experience skin changes. The most common manifestations are hyperpigmentation and haemangiomas. Other skin abnormalities include thickening, hypertrichosis, acquired facial lipoatrophy, and infiltrating livedo reticularis with necrosis. POEMS syndrome can also cause Vascular-type skin changes including acrocyanosis, flushing, hyperaemia, and Raynaud's phenomenon. Nail changes consist of leukonychia and clubbing.

==== Papilledema ====
Papilledema is often one of the earliest signs of POEMS disease and is usually bilateral. Patients tend to be asymptomatic, however, they may report headaches, brief obscurations of vision, scotomata, large blind spots, and gradual visual field constriction. Papilledema has been noted in 29–64% of patients and is associated with an unfavorable prognosis.

==== Hematological alterations ====
50% of POEMS patients have thrombocytosis and polyglobulia develops in 15% of patients. Those with thrombocytosis and erythrocytosis are often misdiagnosed with chronic myeloproliferative disease before POEMS syndrome is identified.

=== Laboratory findings ===
In addition to tests corresponding to the above findings, such as EMG for neuropathy, CT scan, bone marrow biopsy to detect clonal plasma cells, plasma or serum protein electrophoresis to myeloma proteins, other tests can give abnormal results supporting the diagnosis of POEMS syndrome. These included raised blood levels of VEGF, thrombocytes, and/or erythrocyte parameters.

=== Differential diagnosis ===
Patients diagnosed as having Castleman disease but also exhibiting many of the symptoms and signs of POEMS syndrome but lacking evidence of a peripheral neuropathy and clonal plasma cells should not be diagnosed as having POEMS syndrome. They are better classified as having Castleman disease variant of POEMS syndrome. These patients may exhibit high blood levels of the interleukin-6 cytokine and have an inferior overall survival compared to POEMS syndrome patients. Treatment of patients with this POEMS syndrome variant who have evidence of bone lesions and/or myeloma proteins are the same as those for POEMS syndrome patients. In the absence of these features, treatment with rituximab, a monoclonal antibody preparation directed against B cells bearing the CD20 antigen, or siltuximab, a monoclonal antibody preparation directed against interleukin-6, may be justified.

== Treatment ==
As reported by Dispenzieri et al. Mayo Clinic treatment regimens are tailored to treat the clinical manifestations and prognosis for the rate of progression of the POEMS syndrome in each patient. In rare cases, patients may have minimal or no symptoms at presentation or after successful treatment of their disorder. These patients may be monitored every 2–3 months for symptoms and disease progression. Otherwise, treatment is divided based on the local versus systemic spread of its clonal plasma cells. Patients with one or two plasmacytoma bone lesions and no clonal plasma cells in their bone marrow biopsy specimens are treated by surgical removal or radiotherapy of their tumors. These treatments can relieve many of the syndromes clinical manifestations including neuropathies, have a 10-year overall survival of 70% and a 6-year progression-free survival of 62%. Patients with >2 plasmacytoma bone lesions and/or increases in bone marrow clonal plasma cells are treated with a low-dose or high-dose chemotherapy regimen, i.e. a corticosteroid such as dexamethasone plus an alkylating agents such as melphalan. Dosage regimens are selected on the basis of patient tolerance. Hematological response rates to the dexamethasone/melphalan regimens have been reported to be in the 80% range with neurological response rates approaching 100%. Patients successfully treated with the high-dose dexamethasone/melphalan regimen have been further treated with autologous stem cell transplantation. In 59 patients treated with the chemotherapy/transplantation regimen, the Mayo Clinic reported progression-free survival rates of 98%, 94%, and 75% at 1, 2, and 5 years, respectively.

Other treatment regimens are being studied. Immunomodulatory imide drugs such as thalidomide and lenalidomide have been used in combination with dexamethasone to treat POEMS syndrome patients. While the mechanism of action of these immunomodulators are not clear, they do inhibit the production of cytokines suspected of contributing to POEMS syndrome such as VEGF, TNFα, and IL-6 and stimulate T cells and NK cells to increase their production of interferon gamma and interleukin 2 (see immunomodulatory imide drug's mechanism of action). A double blind study of 25 POEMS syndrome patients found significantly better results (VEGF reduction, neuromuscular function improvement, quality of life improvement) in patients treated with thalidomide plus dexamethasone compared to patients treated with a thalidomide placebo plus dexamethasone.

Since VEGF plays a central role in the symptoms of POEMS syndrome, some have tried bevacizumab, a monoclonal antibody directed against VEGF. While some reports were positive, others have reported capillary leak syndrome suspected to be the result of overly rapid lowering of VEGF levels. It therefore remains doubtful as to whether this will become part of standard treatment for POEMS syndrome.

== History ==
R. S. Crow, working in Bristol, first described the combination of osteosclerotic myeloma, polyneuropathy and various unusual features (such as pigmentation and clubbing) in two patients aged 54 and 67, in 1956.
