= Iberdomide =

Chemical compound

Clinical data
- Trade names: Zenbexus
- Other names: CC-220
- AHFS/Drugs.com: Zenbexus
- License data: US DailyMed: Iberdomide
- Routes of administration: By mouth
- Drug class: Cereblon-modulating protein degrader
- ATC code: None

Legal status
- Legal status: US: ℞-only

Identifiers
- IUPAC name: (3S)-3-[7-({4-[(morpholin-4-yl)methyl]phenyl}methoxy)-3-oxo-1H-isoindol-2-yl]piperidine-2,6-dione
- CAS Number: 1323403-33-3; as HCl: 1560678-63-8
- PubChem CID: 67335295; as HCl: 72793904
- IUPHAR/BPS: 9618
- DrugBank: DB12101
- ChemSpider: 52085251
- UNII: 8V66F27X44; as HCl: 79L3645KFI
- KEGG: D11134; as HCl: D11135
- ChEMBL: ChEMBL3989927

Chemical and physical data
- Formula: C_{25}H_{27}N_{3}O_{5}
- Molar mass: 449.507 g·mol^{−1}
- 3D model (JSmol): Interactive image; as HCl: Interactive image
- SMILES: O=C1CC[C@H](N2Cc3c(OCc4ccc(CN5CCOCC5)cc4)cccc3C2=O)C(=O)N1; as HCl: Cl.O=C1N(CC2=C1C=CC=C2OCC3=CC=C(CN4CCOCC4)C=C3)[C@H]5CCC(=O)NC5=O
- InChI: InChI=1S/C25H27N3O5/c29-23-9-8-21(24(30)26-23)28-15-20-19(25(28)31)2-1-3-22(20)33-16-18-6-4-17(5-7-18)14-27-10-12-32-13-11-27/h1-7,21H,8-16H2,(H,26,29,30)/t21-/m0/s1; Key:IXZOHGPZAQLIBH-NRFANRHFSA-N; as HCl: InChI=1S/C25H27N3O5.ClH/c29-23-9-8-21(24(30)26-23)28-15-20-19(25(28)31)2-1-3-22(20)33-16-18-6-4-17(5-7-18)14-27-10-12-32-13-11-27;/h1-7,21H,8-16H2,(H,26,29,30);1H/t21-;/m0./s1; Key:VVHQVXXPZDALDV-BOXHHOBZSA-N

Iberdomide, sold under the brand name Zenbexus, is an anti-cancer medication used for the treatment of multiple myeloma. It is a cereblon-modulating protein degrader and a thalidomide analog.. It is taken by mouth.

Iberdomide was approved for medical use in the United States in August 2026.

== Medical uses ==
Iberdomide is indicated in combination with daratumumab, hyaluronidase, and dexamethasone for the treatment of adults with multiple myeloma who have received at least one prior line of therapy including a proteasome inhibitor and an immunomodulatory agent.

== Adverse effects ==
The US prescribing information includes a boxed warning for embryo-fetal toxicity and serious venous and arterial thromboembolism, as well as warnings and precautions for neutropenia, infections, and secondary primary malignancies.

== History ==
Iberdomide was developed by Bristol Myers Squibb and has a higher binding affinity than lenalidomide or pomalidomide. It has undergone clinical trials for various cancers and was also tested in people with lupus.

Efficacy was evaluated in EXCALIBER-RRMM (NCT04975997), a two-stage, randomized, multi-center, open-label trial in adults with relapsed or refractory multiple myeloma who had previously received one or two prior lines of therapy. People who had disease refractory to prior anti-CD38 monoclonal antibody therapy, or to prior bortezomib were excluded. A total of 939 participants were randomized to one of three dose levels of iberdomide in combination with daratumumab and hyaluronidase and dexamethasone (IberDd) or to daratumumab and hyaluronidase, bortezomib and dexamethasone (DVd) in stage 1 (n=279); or to iberdomide 1 mg in combination with daratumumab and hyaluronidase and dexamethasone (Dd) or DVd in stage 2 (n=660).

== Society and culture ==
=== Legal status ===
Iberdomide was approved for medical use in the United States in August 2026. The U.S. Food and Drug Administration (FDA) granted the application for iberdomide priority review, breakthrough therapy, and orphan drug designations.

=== Names ===
Iberdomide is the international nonproprietary name.

Iberdomide is sold under the brand name Zenbexus.
