= Juno Therapeutics =

American biopharmaceutical company

Juno Therapeutics, Inc.
- Company type: Subsidiary
- Traded as: Nasdaq: JUNO
- Industry: Biotechnology
- Founded: 2013; 13 years ago
- Headquarters: Seattle, Washington
- Key people: Hans Bishop (CEO & president); Steve Harr, M.D. (CFO); Hyam Levitsky, M.D. (CSO); Mark Gilbert, M.D. (CMO)
- Parent: Bristol-Myers Squibb
- Website: www.bms.com

Juno Therapeutics, Inc. was an American biopharmaceutical company founded in 2013 through a collaboration of the Fred Hutchinson Cancer Research Center, Memorial Sloan-Kettering Cancer Center and pediatrics partner Seattle Children's Research Institute. The company was launched with an initial investment of $120 million, with a remit to develop a pipeline of cancer immunotherapy drugs. The company raised $300 million through private funding and a further $265 million through their IPO.

On January 22, 2018, Juno Therapeutics was acquired by biotechnology company Celgene for $9 billion.

In November 2019, Bristol-Myers Squibb (BMS) announced that it has completed its acquisition of Celgene.

== History ==
In December 2014 the company signed an agreement with Opus Bio, Inc for a chimeric antigen receptor (CAR-T) cell product candidate targeting CD22.

In April 2015 the company entered into a collaboration with MedImmune (a subsidiary of AstraZeneca) investigating combination treatments for cancer. The trials will assess combinations of MEDI4736 and one of Juno's CD19 directed chimeric antigen receptor T cell candidates. In May 2015, the company announced its intention to acquire Stage Cell Therapeutics for up to $223 million. Later in the same month the company launched a collaboration, with Editas Medicine, to create CAR-T and high-affinity T cell receptor therapies to treat cancer, with the potential to generate up to $737 million-plus for Editas. In June, the company acquired X-Body for more than $44 million. In June, the company announced a 10-year partnership with Celgene valued at $1 billion. As part of the deal Celgene will pay Juno $150 million and acquire 9.1 million new Juno shares (valued at $93, existing Juno shares rose 26% to $58.38). Celgene will gain the right to sell Juno's therapies around the world. This partnership surpasses the previous highest record when Pfizer agreed to a deal with Merck KGaA in 2014.

In January 2016 Juno announced it had acquired AbVitro, allowing it to use next-generation single cell sequencing platforms to complement its ability to create T cells engineered to target a broad array of cancer targets. Later in July of the same year, the company announced it would acquire RedoxTherapies for $10 million. This acquisition provides Juno with an exclusive license to vipadenant, a small molecule adenosine A2a (A2a) receptor antagonist that has the potential to disrupt important immunosuppressive pathways in the tumor microenvironment in certain cancers. In August the company announced it would license rights from Memorial Sloan Kettering Cancer Center and Eureka Therapeutics for a novel, fully human binding domain targeting B-cell maturation antigen.

In January 2018, Celgene announced it would acquire Juno for $9 billion.

- Juno Therapeutics
  - AbVitro
    (Acq 2016)
  - - RedoxTherapies
      (Acq 2016)

== Drug approval ==
- Lisocabtagene maraleucel (liso-cel), the company's autologous anti-CD19 chimeric antigen receptor (CAR) T-cell immunotherapy with a defined composition of purified CD8+ and CD4+ CAR T cells for the treatment of adult patients with relapsed or refractory (R/R) large B-cell lymphoma after at least two prior therapies. On February 5, 2021, the U.S. Food and Drug Administration approved Breyanzi (lisocabtagene maraleucel), a cell-based gene therapy to treat adult patients with certain types of large B-cell lymphoma who have not responded to, or who have relapsed after, at least two other types of systemic treatment.

== See also ==
- Gene therapy
