= Mezigdomide =

Chemical compound

Legal status
- Legal status: Investigational

Identifiers
- IUPAC name: 4-{4-[(4-{[2-((3S)-2,6-dioxopiperidin-3-yl)-1-oxo-3H-isoindol-4-yl]oxymethyl}phenyl)methyl]piperazin-1-yl}-3-fluorobenzonitrile
- CAS Number: 2259648-80-9
- PubChem CID: 137379043
- ChemSpider: 84451594
- UNII: LA88IH4O02
- ChEMBL: ChEMBL4648616

Chemical and physical data
- Formula: C_{32}H_{30}FN_{5}O_{4}
- Molar mass: 567.621 g·mol^{−1}
- 3D model (JSmol): Interactive image
- SMILES: N#Cc1ccc(N2CCN(Cc3ccc(COc4cccc5c4CN([C@H]4CCC(=O)NC4=O)C5=O)cc3)CC2)c(F)c1
- InChI: InChI=1S/C32H30FN5O4/c33-26-16-23(17-34)8-9-27(26)37-14-12-36(13-15-37)18-21-4-6-22(7-5-21)20-42-29-3-1-2-24-25(29)19-38(32(24)41)28-10-11-30(39)35-31(28)40/h1-9,16,28H,10-15,18-20H2,(H,35,39,40)/t28-/m0/s1; Key:YTINZZFBHWSAGL-NDEPHWFRSA-N

Mezigdomide is a cereblon E3 ligase modulator developed by Bristol Myers Squibb to treat multiple myeloma.
