= Thalidomide =

Immunomodulatory drug

- Skeletal structures of (R)-thalidomide (top) and (S)-thalidomide (bottom)

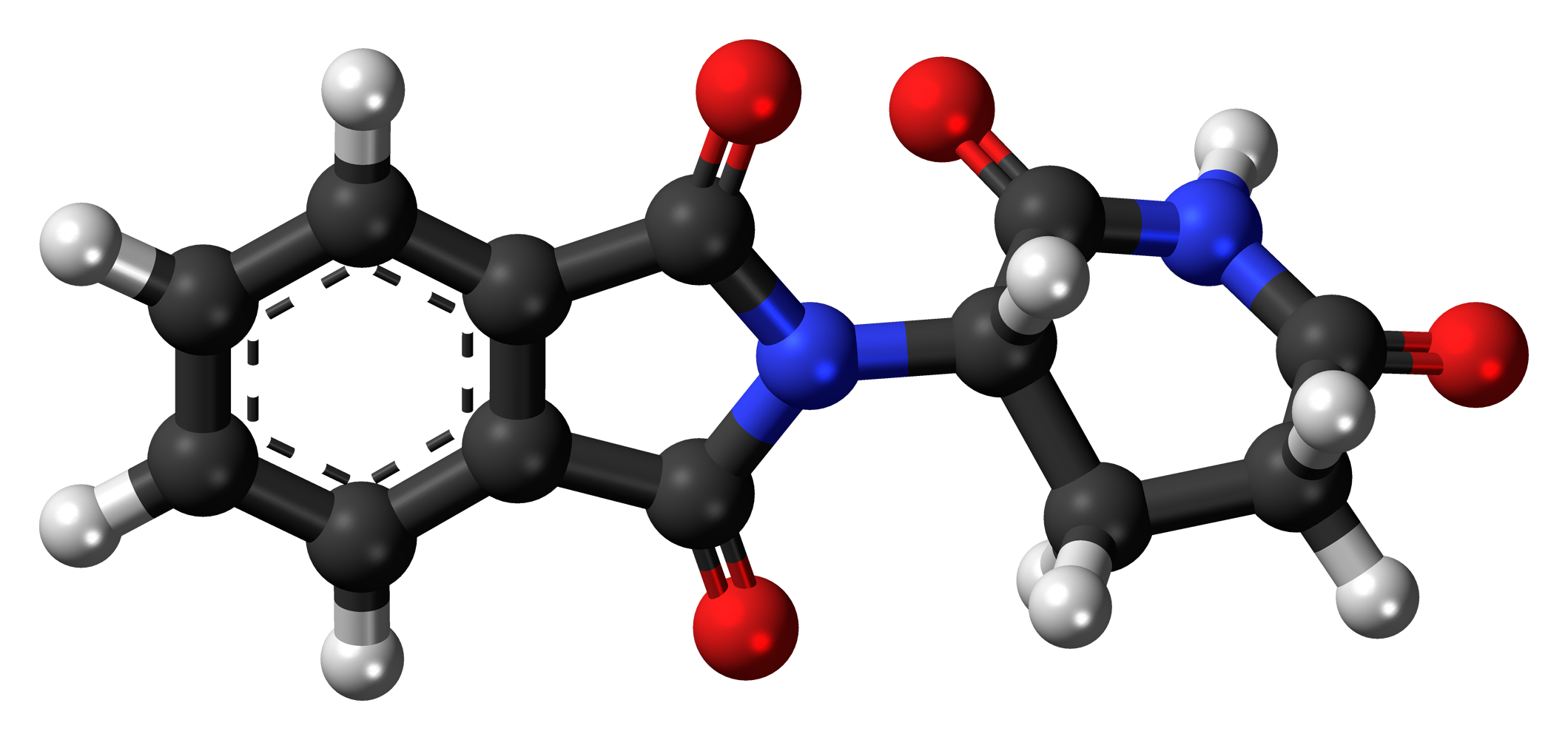

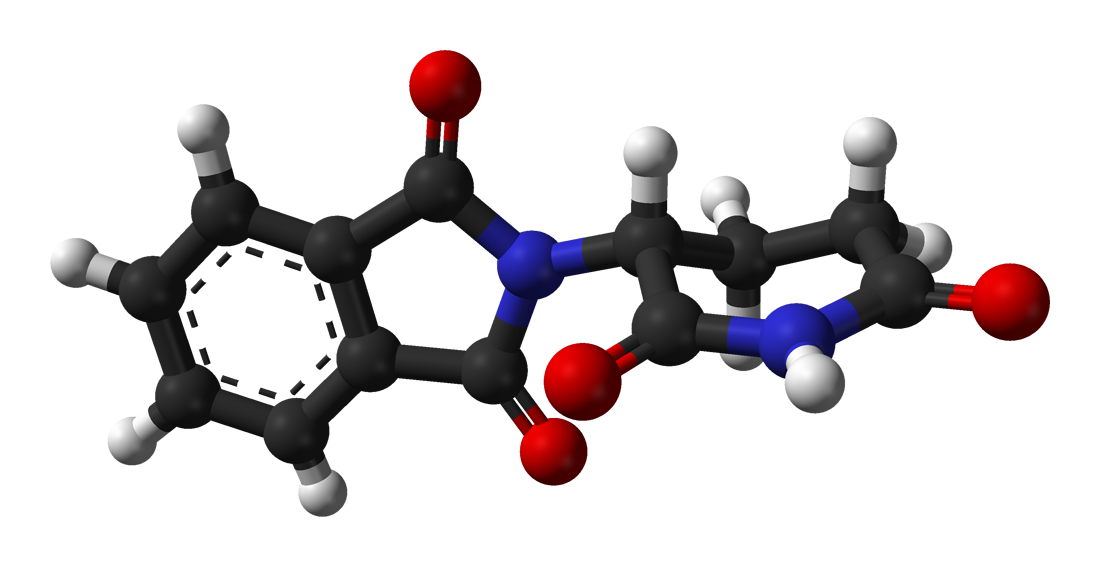
Ball-and-stick model of (S)-thalidomide (left) and (R)-thalidomide (right)

Clinical data
- Pronunciation: /θəˈlɪdəmaɪd/
- Trade names: Contergan, Thalomid, others
- Other names: α-Phthalimidoglutarimide
- AHFS/Drugs.com: Monograph
- MedlinePlus: a699032
- License data: EU EMA: by INN; US DailyMed: Thalidomide; US FDA: Thalidomide
- Pregnancy category: AU: X (High risk)
- Routes of administration: By mouth
- ATC code: L04AX02 (WHO)

Legal status
- Legal status: AU: S4 (Prescription only); BR: Class C3 (Immunosuppressive drugs); CA: ℞-only; UK: POM (Prescription only); US: ℞-only; EU: Rx-only

Pharmacokinetic data
- Bioavailability: 90%
- Protein binding: 55% and 66% for the (R)-(+)- and (S)-(−)-enantiomers, respectively
- Metabolism: Liver (minimally via CYP2C19-mediated 5-hydroxylation; mostly via non-enzymatic hydrolysis at the four amide sites)
- Elimination half-life: 5–7.5 hours (dose-dependent)
- Excretion: Urine, feces and semen

Identifiers
- CAS Number: 50-35-1
- PubChem CID: 5426
- IUPHAR/BPS: 7327
- DrugBank: DB01041
- ChemSpider: 5233
- UNII: 4Z8R6ORS6L
- KEGG: D00754
- ChEBI: CHEBI:9513
- ChEMBL: ChEMBL468
- CompTox Dashboard (EPA): DTXSID9022524
- ECHA InfoCard: 100.000.029

Chemical and physical data
- Formula: C_{13}H_{10}N_{2}O_{4}
- Molar mass: 258.233 g·mol^{−1}
- 3D model (JSmol): Interactive image
- Chirality: Racemic mixture
- Melting point: 270 °C (518 °F)
- SMILES: O=C1c2ccccc2C(=O)N1C3CCC(=O)NC3=O
- InChI: InChI=1S/C13H10N2O4/c16-10-6-5-9(11(17)14-10)15-12(18)7-3-1-2-4-8(7)13(15)19/h1-4,9H,5-6H2,(H,14,16,17); Key:UEJJHQNACJXSKW-UHFFFAOYSA-N

Thalidomide, sold under the brand names Contergan, Distaval and Thalomid among others, is an oral administered medication used to treat a number of cancers (e.g., multiple myeloma), graft-versus-host disease, and skin disorders (e.g., complications of leprosy such as skin lesions). Thalidomide has been used to treat conditions associated with HIV: aphthous ulcers, HIV-associated wasting syndrome, diarrhea, and Kaposi's sarcoma, but increases in HIV viral load have been reported.

Common side effects include sleepiness, rash, and dizziness. Severe side effects include tumor lysis syndrome, blood clots, and peripheral neuropathy. Thalidomide is a human teratogen and carries a high risk of severe, life-threatening birth defects if administered or taken during pregnancy. It causes skeletal deformities such as amelia (absence of legs and/or arms), absence of bones, and phocomelia (malformation of the limbs). A single dose of thalidomide, regardless of dosage, is enough to cause teratogenic effects.

Thalidomide was first marketed in 1957 in West Germany, where it was available as an over-the-counter drug. When first released, thalidomide was promoted for anxiety, trouble sleeping, "tension", and morning sickness. While it was initially thought to be safe in pregnancy, thalidomide was found to cause birth defects, resulting in its removal from the market in Europe in 1961. The total number of infants severely harmed by thalidomide use during pregnancy is estimated at over 10,000, possibly 20,000, of whom about 40% died around the time of birth. Those who survived had limb, eye, urinary tract, and heart problems. Its entry into the US market was at first prevented by Frances Oldham Kelsey, a reviewer at the FDA. The birth defects caused by thalidomide led to the development of greater drug regulation and monitoring in many countries.

It was approved in the United States in 1998 for use as a treatment for cancer. It is on the World Health Organization's List of Essential Medicines. It is available as a generic medication.

== Medical uses ==
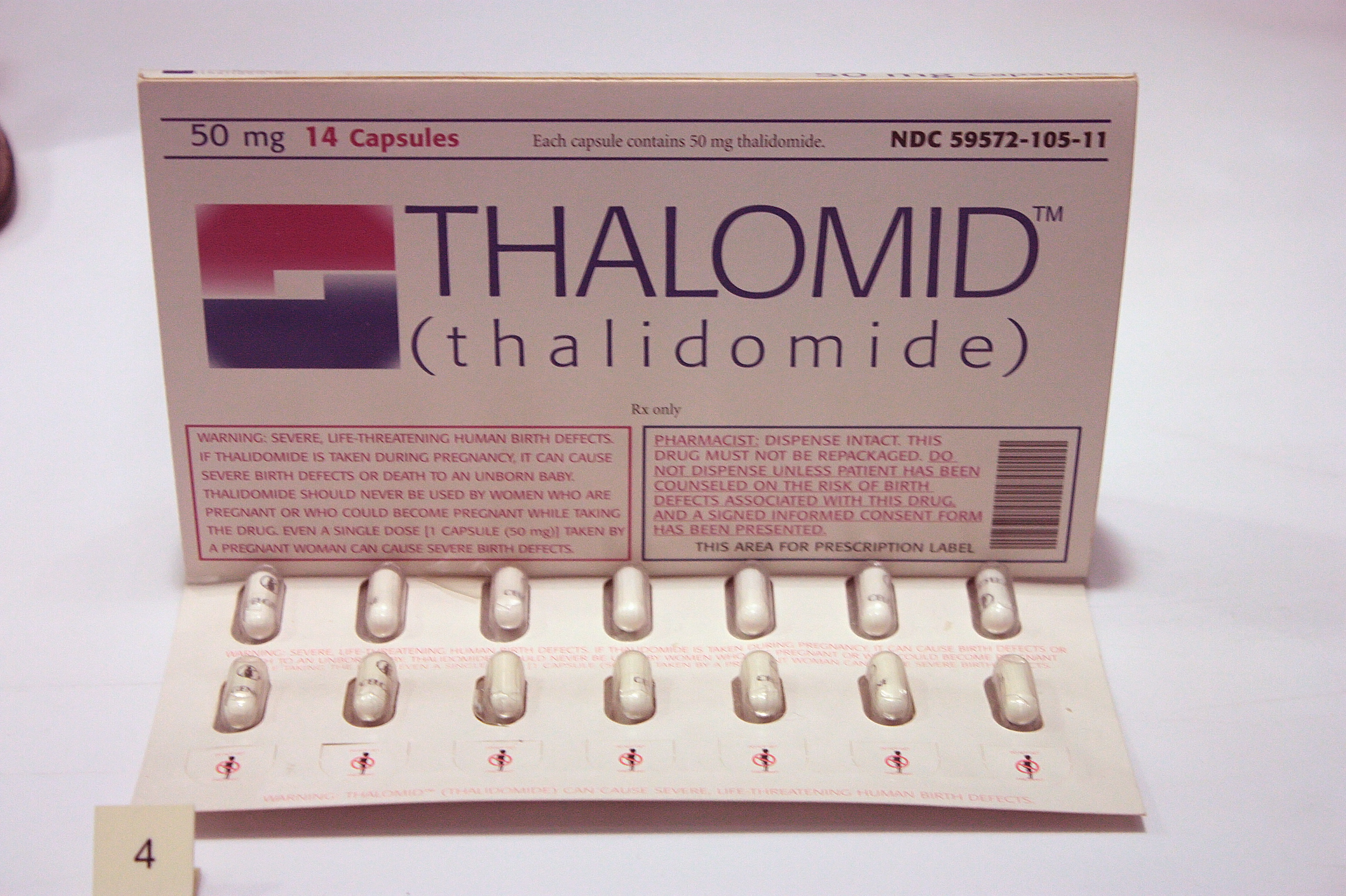
Pack of thalidomide capsules

Thalidomide is used as a first-line treatment for multiple myeloma in combination with dexamethasone or with melphalan and prednisone to treat acute episodes of erythema nodosum leprosum, as well as for maintenance therapy.

The bacterium that causes tuberculosis (TB) is related to leprosy. Thalidomide may be helpful in some cases where standard TB drugs and corticosteroids are not sufficient to resolve severe inflammation in the brain.

It is used as a second-line treatment to manage graft-versus-host disease and aphthous stomatitis in children and has been prescribed for other conditions in children, including actinic prurigo and epidermolysis bullosa; the evidence for these uses is weak. It is recommended only as a third line treatment in graft-versus-host-disease in adults because of lack of efficacy and side effects observed in clinical trials.

== Contraindications ==
Prescriptions of thalidomide are accompanied by strict measures to avoid any possibility of use during pregnancy, and thalidomide should be avoided in women wanting to conceive. In the United States, the prescribing doctor is required to ensure that contraception is being used and that regular pregnancy tests are taken.

== Adverse effects ==
Thalidomide causes birth defects. The U.S. Food and Drug Administration (FDA) and other regulatory agencies have approved marketing of the drug only with an auditable risk evaluation and mitigation strategy that ensures that people using the drug are aware of the risks and avoid pregnancy; this applies to both men and women, as the drug can be transmitted in semen.

There is a high risk that thalidomide can cause excessive blood clots. There is also a high risk that thalidomide can interfere with the production of several types of new blood cells, creating a risk of infection via neutropenia, leukopenia, and lymphopenia, and risks that blood will not clot via thrombocytopenia. There is also a risk of anemia via lack of red blood cells. The drug can also damage nerves, causing potentially irreversible peripheral neuropathy.

Thalidomide has several adverse cardiovascular effects, including risk of heart attacks, pulmonary hypertension, and changes in heart rhythm, such as syncope, bradycardia, and atrioventricular block.

Thalidomide can cause liver damage and severe skin reactions like Stevens–Johnson syndrome. It tends to make people sleepy, which creates risk when driving and operating other machinery. As it kills cancer cells, it can cause tumor lysis syndrome. Thalidomide can prevent menstruation.

In addition, very common (reported in more than 10% of people) adverse effects include tremor, dizziness, tingling, numbness, constipation, and peripheral edema.

Common adverse effects (reported by 1–10% of people) include confusion, depressed mood, reduced coordination, heart failure, difficulty breathing, interstitial lung disease, lung inflammation, vomiting, dry mouth, rashes, dry skin, fever, weakness, and a sense of unwellness.

=== Interactions ===
There are no expected pharmacokinetic interactions between thalidomide and other medicines due to its neutral effects on P-glycoprotein and the cytochrome P450 family. It may interact with sedatives due to its sedative action and bradycardic agents, like beta-blockers, due to its bradycardia-inducing effects. The risk of peripheral neuropathy may be increased by concomitant treatment of thalidomide with other agents known to cause peripheral neuropathy. The risk of venous thromboembolisms with thalidomide seems to be increased when patients are treated with oral contraceptives or other cytotoxic agents (including doxorubicin and melphalan) concurrently. Thalidomide may interfere with various contraceptives, and hence it is advised that women of reproductive age use at least two different means of contraception to ensure that no child will be conceived while they are taking thalidomide.

=== Overdose ===
As of 2013, eighteen cases of overdoses had been reported with doses of up to 14.4 grams, none of them fatal. No specific antidote for overdose exists and treatment is purely supportive.

== Pharmacology ==
The precise mechanism of action for thalidomide was not known until the twenty-first century, although efforts to identify thalidomide's teratogenic action generated more than 2,000 research papers and the proposal of 15 or 16 plausible mechanisms by 2000. The primary mechanism of action of thalidomide and its analogs in both their anti-cancer and teratogenic effects is now known to be as cereblon E3 ligase modulators.

Thalidomide also binds to and acts as an antagonist of the androgen receptor and hence is a nonsteroidal antiandrogen of some capacity. In accordance, it can produce gynecomastia and sexual dysfunction as side effects in men.

=== Chirality and biological activity ===
Thalidomide is provided as a racemic mixture of two enantiomers; while there are reports that only one of the enantiomers may cause birth defects, the body converts each enantiomer into the other through mechanisms that are not well understood. The (R)-enantiomer has the desired sedative effect while the (S)-enantiomer harbors embryo-toxic and teratogenic effects. The use of R-thalidomide does not remove the risk of birth defects, as it was demonstrated that the "safe" R-thalidomide undergoes an in vivo chiral inversion to the teratogenic S-thalidomide. Under biological conditions, the enantiomers interconvert (bidirectional chiral inversion – (R)- to (S)- and vice versa).

== Chemistry ==
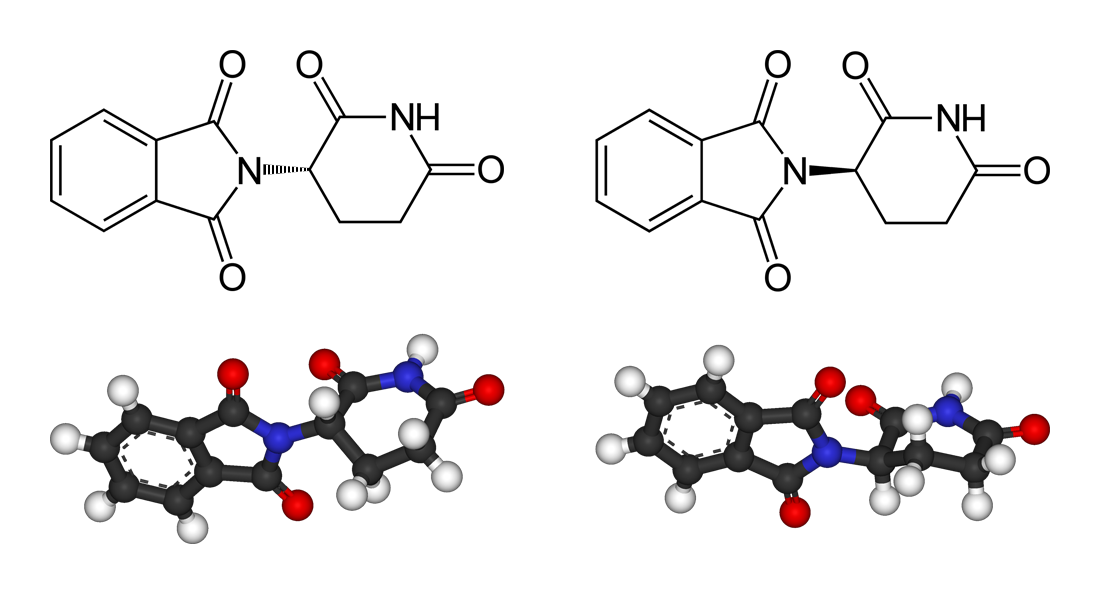
The two enantiomers of thalidomide: Left: (S)-(−)-thalidomide Right: (R)-(+)-thalidomide

Thalidomide is a chiral molecule, and when synthesized is formed as racemic; while S-thalidomide is the bioactive form of the molecule, the individual enantiomers can racemize to each other due to the acidic hydrogen at the chiral centre, which is the carbon of the glutarimide ring bonded to the phthalimide substituent. The racemization process can occur in vivo. The process of conversion of one enantiomer to its mirror-image version with no other change in the molecule is called chiral inversion.

Celgene Corporation originally synthesized thalidomide using a three-step sequence starting with L-glutamic acid treatment, but this has since been reformed by the use of L-glutamine. As shown in the image below, N-carbethoxyphthalimide (1) can react with L-glutamine to yield N-phthaloyl-L-glutamine (2). Cyclization of N-phthaloyl-L-glutamine occurs using carbonyldiimidazole, which then yields thalidomide (3). Celgene Corporation's original method resulted in a 31% yield of S-thalidomide, whereas the two-step synthesis yields 85–93% product that is 99% pure.

In 2023, it is reported that phthalic anhydride and L-glutamine under suitable conditions can react directly to form thalidomide. In the procedure, phthalic anhydride and L-glutamine are grounded and added into toluene solvent. The solution, along with triethylamine and acetic anhydride, is refluxed at ~110°C for 9 hours; after that the solution goes through a simple vacuum filtration procedure to obtain the product.

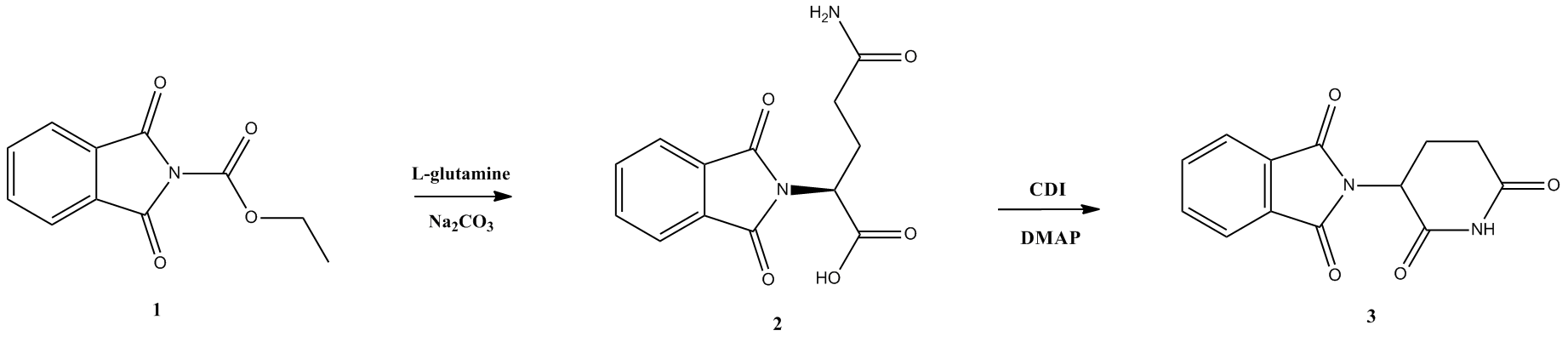
Muller et al.'s two-step thalidomide synthesis

== History ==
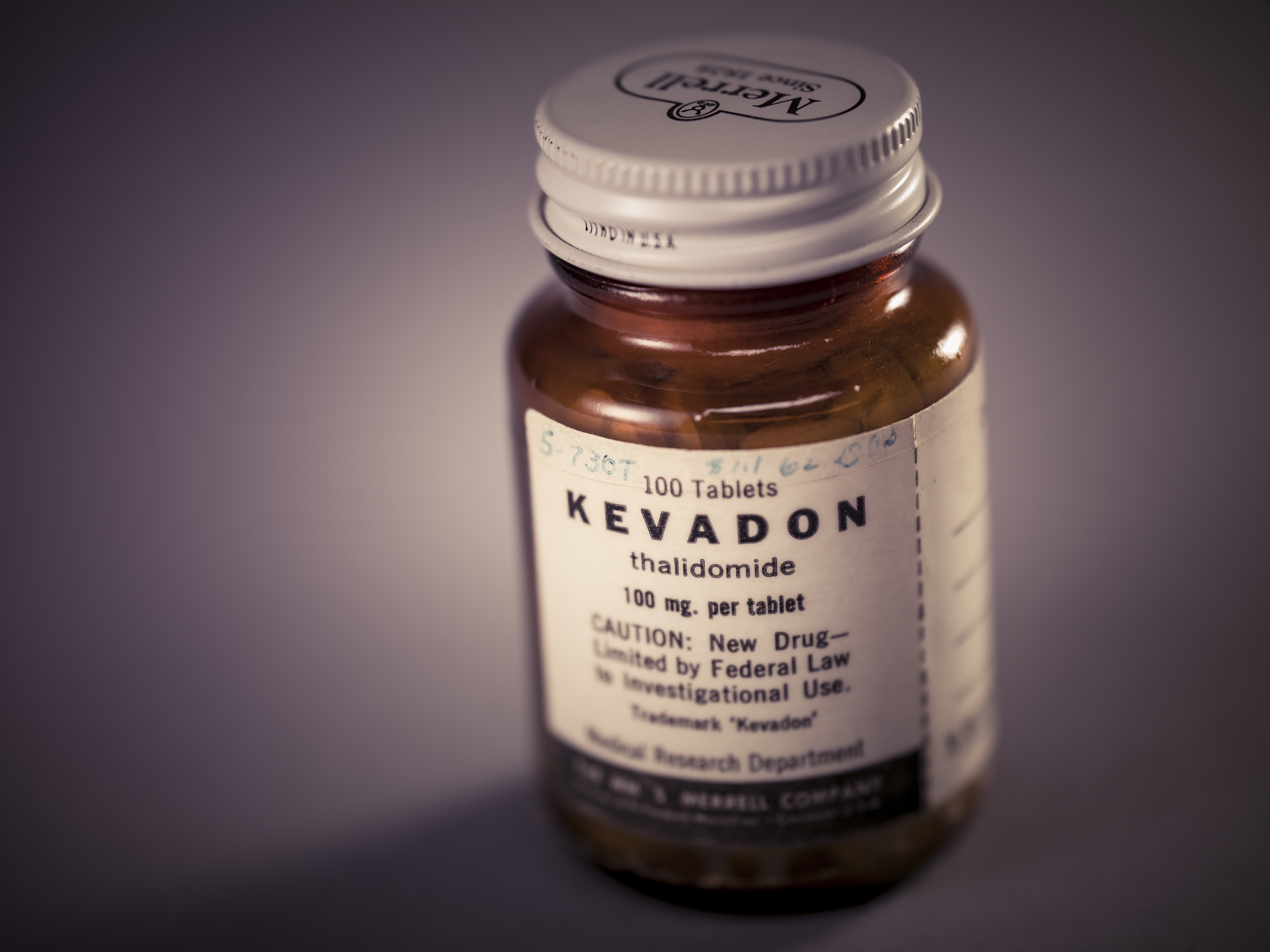
Container of Kevadon brand of thalidomide from 1960

In 1952, thalidomide was synthesised by Chemical Industry Basel (CIBA), but was found "to have no effect on animals" and was discarded on that basis. In 1957, it was acquired by Chemie Grünenthal in Germany. The German company had been established as a soap maker after World War II ended, to address the urgent market need for antibiotics. Heinrich Mückter was appointed to head the discovery program based on his experience working with the German army's antiviral research. While preparing reagents for the work, Mueckter's assistant Wilhelm Kunz isolated a by-product that was recognized by pharmacologist Herbert Keller as an analog of glutethimide, a sedative. The medicinal chemistry work turned to improving the lead compound into a suitable drug: the result was thalidomide. The toxicity was examined in several animals, and the drug was introduced in 1956 as a sedative, but it was never tested on pregnant women.

Researchers at Chemie Grünenthal found that thalidomide was a particularly effective antiemetic that had an inhibitory effect on morning sickness. On 1 October 1957, the company launched thalidomide and began marketing it under the trade name Contergan. It was proclaimed a "wonder drug" for insomnia, coughs, colds and headaches.

During that period, the use of medications during pregnancy was not strictly controlled, and drugs were not thoroughly tested for potential harm to the fetus. Thousands of pregnant women took the drug to relieve their symptoms. At the time of the drug's development, scientists did not believe any drug taken by a pregnant woman could pass across the placental barrier and harm the developing fetus. There soon appeared reports of abnormalities in children being born to mothers using thalidomide. In late 1959, it was noticed that peripheral neuritis developed in patients who took the drug over a period of time, and it was only after this point that thalidomide ceased to be provided over the counter.

While initially considered safe, the drug was responsible for teratogenic deformities in children born after their mothers used it during pregnancies, prior to the third trimester. In November 1961, thalidomide was taken off the market due to massive pressure from the press and public. Experts estimate that thalidomide led to the death of approximately 2,000 children and serious birth defects in more than 10,000 children, with over half of them in West Germany. The regulatory authorities in East Germany never approved thalidomide. One reason for the initially unobserved side effects of the drug and the subsequent approval in West Germany was that at that time drugs did not have to be tested for teratogenic effects. They were tested for toxicity on rodents only, as was usual at the time.

In the UK, the British pharmaceutical company The Distillers Company (Biochemicals) Ltd, a subsidiary of Distillers Co. Ltd (now part of Diageo), marketed thalidomide throughout the UK, Australia, and New Zealand, under the brand name Distaval, as a remedy for morning sickness. Their advertisement claimed that "Distaval can be given with complete safety to pregnant women and nursing mothers without adverse effect on mother or child ... Outstandingly safe Distaval has been prescribed for nearly three years in this country." Globally, more pharmaceutical companies started to produce and market the drug under license from Chemie Grünenthal. Thalidomide was available in 46 countries under many different brand names.

In the US, representatives from Chemie Grünenthal approached Smith, Kline & French (SKF), now GlaxoSmithKline, with a request to market and distribute the drug in North America. A memorandum, rediscovered in 2010 in the archives of the FDA, shows that in 1956–57, as part of its in-licensing approach, Smith, Kline and French conducted animal tests and ran a clinical trial of the drug in the US involving 875 people, including pregnant women. In 1956, researchers involved in clinical trials at SKF noted that, even when used in very high doses, thalidomide could not induce sleep in mice. When administered at doses 50 to 650 times larger than that claimed by Chemie Grünenthal to be "sleep-inducing", the researchers could still not achieve the hypnotic effect in animals that it had on humans. After completion of the trial, and based on reasons kept hidden for decades, SKF declined to commercialize the drug. In 1958, Chemie Grünenthal reached an agreement with the William S. Merrell Company in Cincinnati, Ohio (later Richardson-Merrell, now part of Sanofi), to market and distribute thalidomide throughout the US.

The US FDA refused to approve thalidomide for marketing and distribution. However, the drug was distributed without approval in large quantities for testing purposes, after the American distributor and manufacturer Richardson-Merrell had applied for its approval in September 1960. The official in charge of the FDA review, Frances Oldham Kelsey, did not rely on information from the company, which did not include any test results. Richardson-Merrell was called on to perform tests and report the results. The company demanded approval six times and was refused each time. Because the drug had to be ingested by pregnant mothers before the third trimester, and because the limited distribution started in September 1960 and was outright banned during winter of 1961, it would have only effected U. S. babies with birthdays between December 1960 and March 1961. In spite of that 4-month window, and the limited amount of the drug released for "testing", the unapproved distribution still resulted in at least 17 documented cases of children born in the US with thalidomide-induced malformations and with the possibility of as many as 100 cases.

Oldham Kelsey was awarded the President's Award for Distinguished Federal Civilian Service by President Kennedy in 1962 for not allowing thalidomide to be approved for sale in the US. She was also inducted into the National Women's Hall of Fame in 2000.

Canada's Food and Drug Directorate approved the sale of thalidomide by prescription in November 1960. There were many different forms sold: Kevadon, produced by the William S. Merrell Company seeking approval for its thalidomide product, was released on the market in April 1961, and the most common variant (Horner's Talimol) was put on the market on October 23 of the same year. Two months after Talimol went on sale, pharmaceutical companies sent physicians letters warning about the risk of birth defects. It was not until March 1962 that both drugs were banned from the Canadian market by the directorate, and soon afterward physicians were warned to destroy their supplies.

=== Leprosy treatment ===
In 1964, Israeli physician Jacob Sheskin administered thalidomide to a patient critically ill with leprosy. The patient exhibited erythema nodosum leprosum (ENL), a painful skin condition, one of the complications of leprosy. The treatment was attempted despite the ban on thalidomide's use, and the results were favourable: the patient slept for hours and was able to get out of bed without aid upon awakening. A clinical trial studying the use of thalidomide in leprosy soon followed.

Thalidomide has been used by Brazilian physicians as the drug of choice for the treatment of severe ENL since 1965, and by 1996, at least 33 cases of thalidomide embryopathy were recorded in people born in Brazil after 1965. Since 1994, the production, dispensing, and prescription of thalidomide have been strictly controlled, requiring women to use two forms of birth control and submit to regular pregnancy tests. Despite this, cases of thalidomide embryopathy continue, with at least 100 cases identified in Brazil between 2005 and 2010. Nearly 6 million thalidomide pills were distributed throughout Brazil in this time period, and these cases have occurred despite the controls.

In 1998, the FDA approved the drug's use in the treatment of ENL. Because of thalidomide's potential for causing birth defects, the drug may be distributed only under tightly controlled conditions. The FDA required that Celgene Corporation, which planned to market thalidomide under the brand name Thalomid, establish a system for thalidomide education and prescribing safety (STEPS) oversight program. The conditions required under the program include limiting prescription and dispensing rights to authorized prescribers and pharmacies only, keeping a registry of all patients prescribed thalidomide, providing extensive patient education about the risks associated with the drug, and providing periodic pregnancy tests for women who take the drug.

In 2010, the World Health Organization stated that it did not recommend thalidomide for leprosy due to the difficulty of adequately controlling its use, and due to the availability of clofazimine.

=== Cancer treatment ===
Shortly after the teratogenic properties of thalidomide were recognized in the mid-1960s, its anti-cancer potential was explored and two clinical trials were conducted in people with advanced cancer, including some people with multiple myeloma; the trials were inconclusive.

Little further work was done with thalidomide in cancer until the 1990s.

Judah Folkman pioneered studies into the role of angiogenesis (the proliferation and growth of blood vessels) in the development of cancer, and in the early 1970s had shown that solid tumors could not expand without it. In 1993 he surprised the scientific world by hypothesizing the same was true of blood cancers, and the next year he published work showing that a biomarker of angiogenesis was higher in all people with cancer, but especially high in people with blood cancers, and other evidence emerged as well. Meanwhile, a member of his lab, Robert D'Amato, who was looking for angiogenesis inhibitors, discovered in 1994 that thalidomide inhibited angiogenesis and was effective in suppressing tumor growth in rabbits. Around that time, the wife of a man who was dying of multiple myeloma and whom standard treatments had failed, called Folkman asking him about his anti-angiogenesis ideas. Folkman persuaded the patient's doctor to try thalidomide, and that doctor conducted a clinical trial of thalidomide for people with multiple myeloma in which about a third of the subjects responded to the treatment. The results of that trial were published in the New England Journal of Medicine in 1999.

After further work was done by Celgene and others, in 2006 the US Food and Drug Administration granted accelerated approval for thalidomide in combination with dexamethasone for the treatment of newly diagnosed multiple myeloma patients.

It was also evaluated whether thalidomide can be combined with melphalan and prednisone for patients with multiple myeloma. This combination of drugs probably increases the overall survival.

== Society and culture ==
=== Birth defect crisis ===
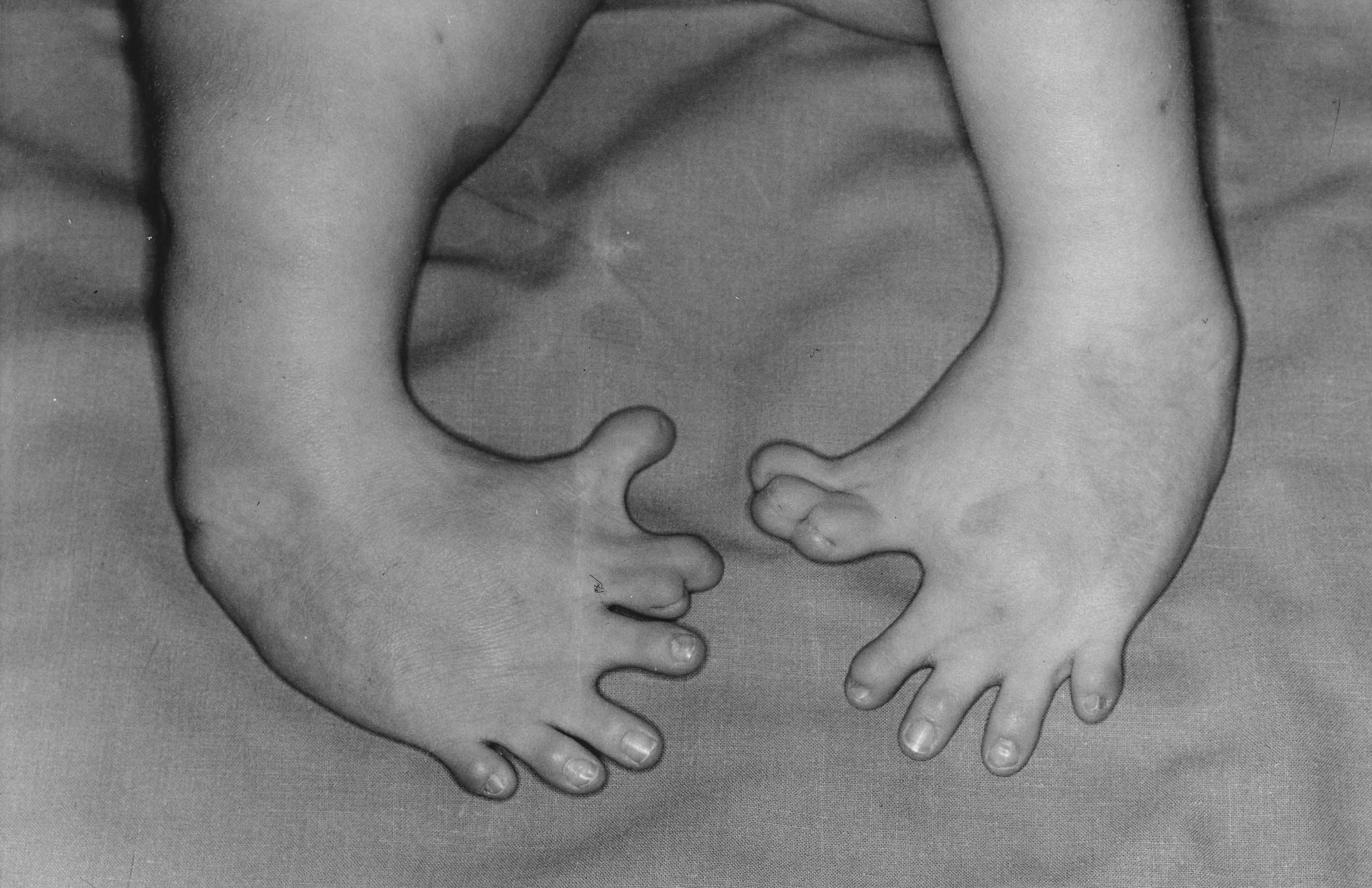
Baby born to a mother who had taken thalidomide while pregnant

In the late 1950s and early 1960s, more than 10,000 children in 46 countries were born with deformities, such as phocomelia, as a consequence of thalidomide use. The severity and location of the deformities depended on how many days into the pregnancy the mother was before beginning treatment, with the time-sensitive window occurring approximately between day 20 and day 36 post-fertilisation. Thalidomide taken on the 20th day of pregnancy caused central brain damage, day 22 the ears and face, day 24 the arms, and leg damage would occur if taken up to day 28.

It is not known exactly how many worldwide victims of the drug there have been, although estimates range from 10,000 to 20,000. Concerns about Thalidomide increased beginning with a letter published by Leslie Florence in the British Medical Journal in December 1960. In November 1961 Widukind Lenz presented evidence linking the births of deformed infants in Europe to thalidomide at a pediatric conference held in Düsseldorf, West Germany on 18 November 1961 that resulted in many countries removing thalidomide from circulation. The full results of his study were published in June 1962.

==== Notable people with disabilities relating to thalidomide exposure ====
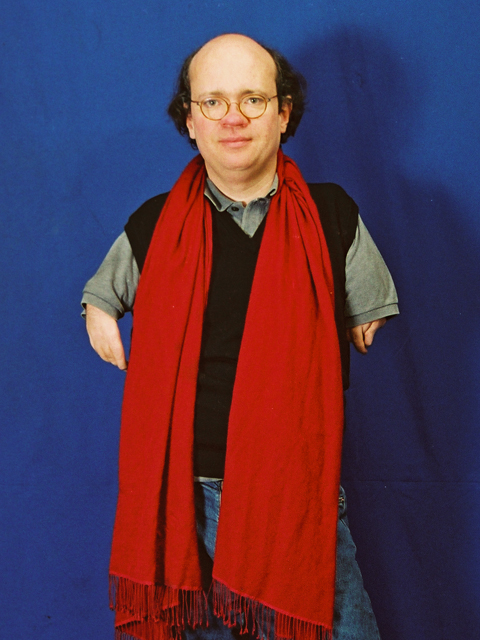
Niko von Glasow, German filmmaker

- Lorraine Mercer of the United Kingdom, born with phocomelia of both arms and legs, is the only thalidomide survivor to carry the Olympic Torch. In 2015, Mercer was appointed MBE for community services with the lonely at the local hospital in Mid-Sussex.
- Thomas Quasthoff, an internationally acclaimed bass-baritone, describes himself: "1.34 meters tall, short arms, seven fingers – four right, three left – large, relatively well-formed head, brown eyes, distinctive lips; profession: singer".
- Niko von Glasow produced a documentary called NoBody's Perfect, based on the lives of 12 people affected by the drug, which was released in 2008.
- Mercédes Benegbi, born with phocomelia of both arms, drove the successful campaign for compensation from her government for Canadians who were affected by thalidomide.
- Mat Fraser, born with phocomelia of both arms, is an English rock musician, actor, writer and performance artist. He produced the 2002 television documentary Born Freak, which looked at this historical tradition and its relevance to modern disabled performers. This work has become the subject of academic analysis in the field of disability studies.
- Sue Kent, born in 1963 with phocomelia of both arms, eight inches long, no thumbs, and seven fingers – three on one hand, four on the other – has appeared as a presenter on the BBC TV show Gardener's World since 2020, demonstrating her ability to garden using her feet and toes where others would use their hands.
- Christian Lohr, born in 1962 with phocomelia of both arms and both legs, is a Swiss politician in the legislature in the Canton Thurgau including 2 years as its president and has been a member of the national legislature since 2011.
- Michaelina Argy (born 1962) chaired the National Advisory Committee of the Thalidomide Trust, advised BBC producers for drama storylines covering thalidomide survivors and was appointed MBE in 2015.
- Rosaleen Moriarty-Simmonds (born 1960) is known for her advocacy work on behalf of disabled people, her role in establishing the Thalidomide Memorial in Cardiff.
- Josée Lake is a Canadian Paralympic gold medallist swimmer, thalidomide survivor, and president of the Thalidomide Victims Association of Canada
- Alvin Law, Canadian motivational speaker and former radio broadcaster.

=== Change in drug regulations ===
The disaster prompted many countries to introduce tougher rules for the testing and licensing of drugs, such as the 1962 Kefauver Harris Amendment (US), 1965 Directive 65/65/EEC1 (EU), and the Medicines Act 1968 (UK). In the United States, the new regulations strengthened the FDA, among other ways, by requiring applicants to prove efficacy and to disclose all side effects encountered in testing. The FDA subsequently initiated the Drug Efficacy Study Implementation to reclassify drugs already on the market.

=== Impact on research involving women ===
In 1977 the US Federal Drug Administration published a clinical trial guideline that excluded women of "childbearing potential" from the early phases of most clinical trials, which in practice led to their exclusion from later trial phases as well. This 1977 FDA guideline was implemented in response to a protectionist climate caused by the thalidomide tragedy. In the 1980s, a US task force on women's health concluded that a lack of women's health research (in part due to the FDA guideline) had compromised the amount and quality of information available about diseases and treatments affecting women. This led to the National Institute of Health policy that women should, when beneficial, be included in clinical trials.

=== Quality of life ===
In the 1960s, thalidomide was successfully marketed as a safer alternative to barbiturates. Due to a successful marketing campaign, thalidomide was widely used by pregnant women during the first trimester of pregnancy. However, thalidomide is a teratogenic substance, and a proportion of children born during the 1960s had thalidomide embryopathy (TE). Of these babies born with TE, "about 40% of them died before their first birthday". The surviving individuals are now middle-aged and they report experiencing challenges (physical, psychological, and socioeconomic) related to TE.

Individuals born with TE frequently experience a wide variety of health problems secondary to their TE. These health conditions include both physical and psychological conditions. When compared to individuals of similar demographic profiles, those born with TE report less satisfaction with their quality of life and their overall health. Access to healthcare services can also be a challenge for these people, and women, in particular, have experienced difficulty in locating healthcare professionals who can understand and embrace their needs.

=== Brand names ===
Brand names include Contergan, Thalomid, Talidex, Talizer, Neurosedyn, Distaval, and many others.

== Research ==
Research efforts have been focused on determining how thalidomide causes birth defects and its other activities in the human body, efforts to develop safer analogs, and efforts to find further uses for thalidomide.

=== Thalidomide analogs ===
The exploration of the antiangiogenic and immunomodulatory activities of thalidomide has led to the study and creation of thalidomide analogs. Celgene has sponsored numerous clinical trials with analogues to thalidomide, such as lenalidomide, that are substantially more powerful and have fewer side effects – except for greater myelosuppression. In 2005, Celgene received FDA approval for lenalidomide (Revlimid) as the first commercially useful derivative. Revlimid is available only in a restricted distribution setting to avoid its use during pregnancy. Further studies are being conducted to find safer compounds with useful qualities. Another more potent analog, pomalidomide, is now FDA-approved. Additionally, apremilast was approved by the FDA in March 2014. These thalidomide analogs can be used to treat different diseases, or used in a regimen to fight two conditions.

Interest turned to pomalidomide, a derivative of thalidomide marketed by Celgene. It is a very active anti-angiogenic agent and also acts as an immunomodulator. Pomalidomide was approved in February 2013 by the FDA as a treatment for relapsed and refractory multiple myeloma. It received a similar approval from the European Commission in August 2013, and is expected to be marketed in Europe under the brand name Imnovid.

=== Clinical research ===
There is no conclusive evidence that thalidomide or lenalidomide is useful to bring about or maintain remission in Crohn's disease.

Thalidomide was studied in a Phase II trial for Kaposi's sarcoma, a rare soft-tissue cancer most commonly seen in the immunocompromised, that is caused by the Kaposi's sarcoma-associated herpesvirus (KSHV).

- AIDS wasting syndrome, associated diarrhea
- Renal cell carcinoma (RCC)
- Glioblastoma multiforme
- Prostate cancer
- Melanoma
- Colorectal cancer
- Crohn's disease
- Rheumatoid arthritis
- Behcet's syndrome
- Breast cancer
- Head and neck cancer
- Ovarian cancer
- Chronic heart failure
- Graft-versus-host disease
- Tuberculous meningitis
