= Christian Lohr =

Swiss politician (born 1962)

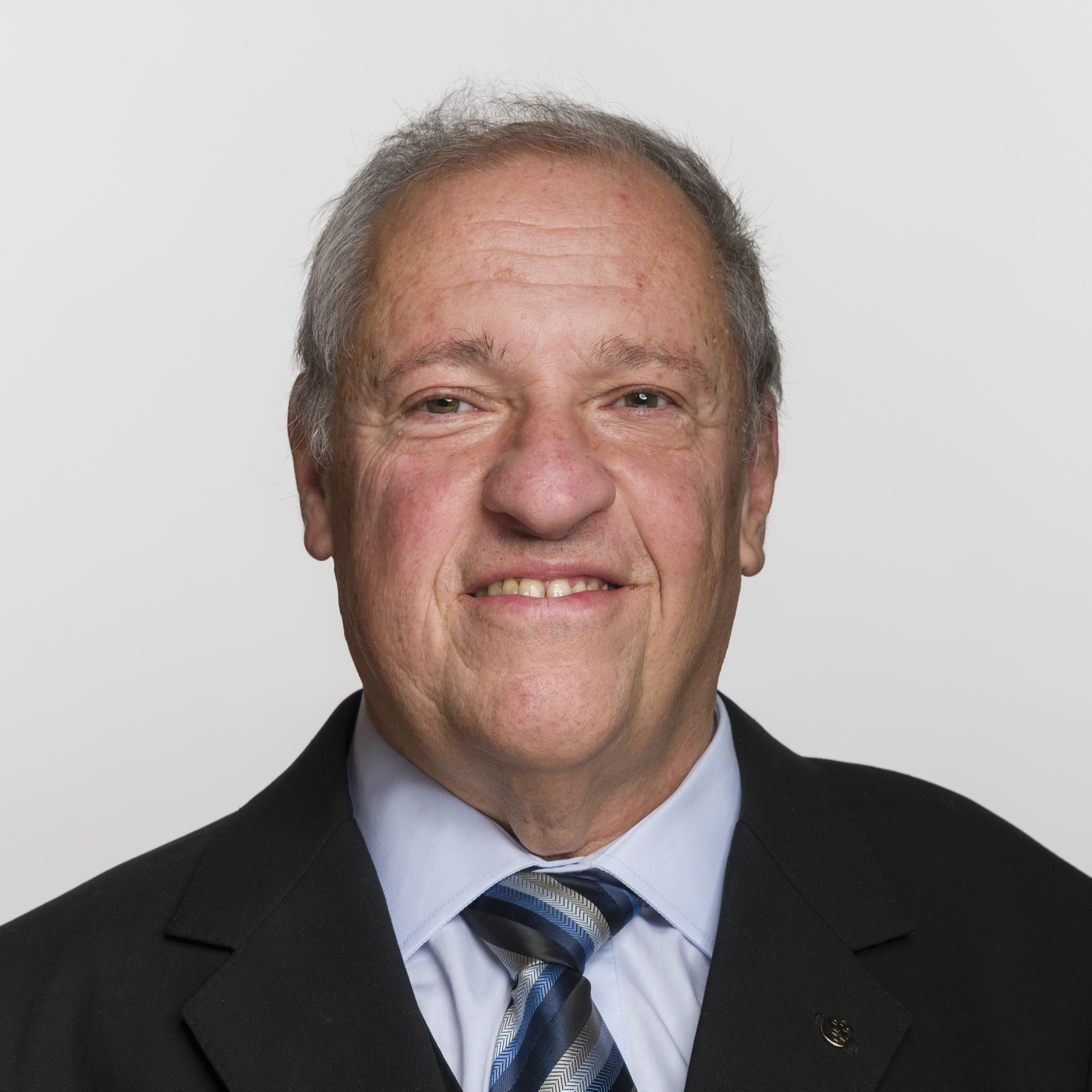
- Christian Lohr (2019)

Member of the National Council (Switzerland)
- Incumbent
- Assumed office December 5, 2011
- Constituency: Canton of Thurgau

Personal details
- Born: Christian Lohr; April 5, 1962 (age 64) Kreuzlingen
- Citizenship: Swiss
- Party: The Centre, former CVP
- Occupation: journalist

Christian Lohr (born May 5, 1962) is a Swiss politician of the party The Centre (DM, CVP until 2021). He is a member of the National Council.

== Career ==
After passing the Matura, he studied economics at the University of Constance and became a journalist and publisher. He is also teaching at several institutes of higher education and on the board of multiple advocacy groups for disability rights. From 1994 to 2008 he served as the president of the Swiss disability sports group Plusport Behindertensport Schweiz and since 1999 he served on the board of Pro Infirmis.

In 1999 he was elected to the local council of his hometown of Kreuzlingen. From 2000 to 2014 he was in the legislature of Thurgau and became its president in 2008 and 2009. In 2011 he was placed second in the elections for the National Council within the CVP list; however he was able to enter the National Council since the person with the most votes, Brigitte Häberli-Koller, was elected to the Council of States and declined her seat in the National Council.

Lohr was born with serious birth defects caused by his mother's exposure during pregnancy to the drug thalidomide, he lacks arms and has only partial use of his legs. He is unmarried and lives in Kreuzlingen.
