= Mercédes Benegbi =

Canadian disabilities activist

- Born: 1962 (age 62–63); Montreal, Quebec
- Occupation: Disabilities activist
- Known for: Advocating for thalidomide survivors

Mercédes Benegbi (born 1962) is a Canadian disabilities activist who has been recognized for her advocacy for the rights of disabled people. In 2000, she was honoured by the Council of Canadians with Disabilities and in 2014, she drove a successful initiative to gain support for the survivors of thalidomide. Her efforts resulted in life-time compensation for Canadian "thalidomiders", as well as a special fund for specific medical treatments or modifications to homes and vehicles to accommodate their disabilities.

== Early life ==
Mercédes Benegbi was born in 1962 in Montreal, Quebec, Canada to her Québécoise mother, Colette, and Moroccan father Marcos Benegbi. Her mother had been prescribed the drug thalidomide during her pregnancy, resulting in Benegbi being born with phocomelia. Her parents strongly advocated for her acceptance among other children and enrolled her in École Ernest Crepeau. She was also enrolled in the Montreal Rehabilitation Institute's 20-year plan to assist survivors and their families in meeting the everyday challenges their children would face. Her father invented a visor for Benegbi to use as a child to prevent her harming her face when she fell, as she had no arms to break her fall. As she was their only child, Benegbi's parents were supportive and at the same time, challenged her to excel and be as independent as she was able to be.

== Career ==
Benegbi has worked as a disability advocate for over twenty years, serving on the board of the Confederation of Organizations of Persons with Disabilities of Quebec (French: Confederation des Organismes de Personnes Handicapes du Quebec (COPHAN)), for which she was honoured in 2000 by the Council of Canadians with Disabilities. Since 2002, she has been the executive director of the Thalidomide Victims Association of Canada and has become one of the leading advocates for Canadian thalidomide survivors. In 2014, Benegbi led a successful initiative to gain compensation from the Canadian government for the children whose lives were impacted by the approval of thalidomide for use in the country, after years of the government refusing to take responsibility for their failure to protect the survivors. On-going health issues and lack of ability to work, caused by their permanent disabilities drove Benegbi to press for a compensation package similar to those survivors of the drug in Europe had received. In 2015, the compensation plan was announced, which provides a tax-free, life-time pension for the "thalidomiters". It also provided a one-time lump sum payment as well as a special medical fund to enable survivors to obtain surgeries specific to their conditions or adapting a home or vehicle for special needs.

Benegbi has spoken throughout the world on the devastating effects to fetal development caused by thalidomide. In 2016, she was awarded an honorary doctorate of laws from the University of Windsor.
