= Celgene =

American biopharmaceutical company

Celgene Corporation
- Type: Subsidiary
- Traded as: Nasdaq: CELG
- Industry: Biotechnology
- Founded: 1986; 40 years ago
- Founder: Sol J. Barer
- Headquarters: Summit, New Jersey, U.S.
- Key people: Robert J. Hugin (executive chairman); Mark Alles (CEO)
- Products: Revlimid; Abraxane; Pomalyst/Imnovid; Thalomid; Idhifa
- Revenue: ▲$15.281 billion (2018)
- Net income: ▲$4.046 billion (2018)
- Total assets: ▲$35.480 billion (2018)
- Total equity: ▼$6.161 billion (2018)
- Number of employees: 8,852 (2018)
- Parent: Bristol Myers Squibb

Celgene Corporation is an American pharmaceutical company that makes cancer and immunology drugs. Its major product is Revlimid (lenalidomide), which is used in the treatment of multiple myeloma, and also in certain anemias. The company is incorporated in Delaware, headquartered in Summit, New Jersey, and a subsidiary of Bristol Myers Squibb (BMS) since its acquisition in 2019.

== History ==
Celgene was originally a unit of Celanese. In 1986, Celanese completed the corporate spin-off of Celgene following the merger of Celanese with American Hoechst.

In August 2000, Celgene acquired Signal Pharmaceuticals, Inc., a privately held company that developed pharmaceuticals to regulate disease-related genes. Signal Pharmaceuticals was rebranded as Celgene Research San Diego.

In December 2002, Celgene acquired Anthrogenesis, a privately held New Jersey–based biotherapeutics company and cord blood banking business, which is developing technology for the recovery of stem cells from placental tissues following the completion of full-term successful pregnancies. Anthrogenesis was rebranded as Celgene Cellular Therapeutics.

In 2006, Celgene certified McKesson Specialty, a specialty pharmacy, as one of a group of pharmacies contracted to launch lenalidomide (Revlimid). As a specialty drug, lenalidomide is only available through the a distribution network consisting of specialty pharmacies contracted by the company.

In March 2008, Celgene acquired Pharmion Corporation for $2.9 billion.

In January 2010, Celgene acquired Gloucester Pharmaceuticals.

In June 2010, Celgene agreed to acquire Abraxis BioScience for $2.9 billion, which produced Abraxane, for the treatment of cancer.

In November 2011, Celgene relocated its United Kingdom headquarters from Windsor, Berkshire, to Stockley Park, near Heathrow airport which is also the home of GlaxoSmithKline's UK operations.

In January 2012, Celgene agreed to acquire Avila Therapeutics, a privately held biotechnology company for $925 million, with $350 million in cash.

In December 2013, Celgene and OncoMed joined a cancer Stem cell therapy development agreement with demcizumab and five other biologics from OncoMed's pipeline.

In October 2014, Sutro Biopharma entered into an agreement with Celgene Corporation to discover and develop multispecific antibodies and antibody drug conjugates (ADCs). This followed the December 2012 collaboration between the two companies and focused on the field of immuno-oncology.

In April 2015, Celgene announced a collaboration with AstraZeneca, worth $450 million, to study their Phase III immuno-oncology drug candidate MEDI4736.

That same month, Celgene exercised its option to acquire Quanticel for up to $485 million to enhance its cancer drug pipeline. Celgene had invested in Quanticel in April 2011.

In June 2015, Celgene exercised its option to license Lyceras RORgamma agonist portfolio for up to $105 million to develop its Phase I lead compound LYC-30937 for the treatment of inflammatory bowel disease. The licensing opportunity gave Celgene the option to acquire Lycera.

In July 2015, the company announced it would acquire Receptos for $7.2 billion in a move to strengthen the company's inflammation and immunology areas.

In May 2016, the company announced it would launch partnership with Agios Pharmaceuticals, developing metabolic immuno-oncology therapies.

In October 2016, the company acquired EngMab AG for $600 million.

In January 2017, the company announced it would acquire Delinia for up to $775 million, increasing the company's autoimmune disease therapy offerings.

In January 2018, Celgene announced it would acquire Impact Biomedicines for $7 billion, adding fedratinib, a kinase inhibitor with potential to treat myelofibrosis.

In March 2018, the company acquired Juno Therapeutics for $9 billion. That month, the company paid $101 million to partner with Vividion on the discovery of small molecules that hit hard-to-drug proteins.

In January 2019, the company committed to pay up to $980 million to license TRPH-395, a small molecule that targets protein-protein interactions and epigenetic regulation in leukemia and lymphoma.

In March 2019, the company partnered with Exscientia on three of its drug programs targeting oncology and autoimmunity.

In November 2019, Bristol-Myers Squibb (BMS) acquired the company for $74 billion in the largest pharmaceutical acquisition to date. As part of the acquisition, Amgen acquired the Otezla drug program from Celgene for $13.4 billion. Activist investor Starboard Value opposed the deal, nominating five alternative potential directors on the Bristol-Myers board; however, it retracted its opposition after Institutional Shareholder Services and Glass Lewis supported the transaction and it appeared to have enough shareholder support.

=== Company origin and acquisition history ===
The following is an illustration of the company's major mergers and acquisitions and historical predecessors (this is not a comprehensive list):

- Celgene (Spun off from Celanese in 1986, acquired by Bristol-Myers Squibb in 2019)
  - Signal Pharmaceuticals, Inc (Acq 2000)
  - Anthrogenesis (Acq 2002)
  - Pharmion Corporation (Acq 2008)
  - Gloucester Pharmaceuticals (Acq 2009)
  - Abraxis BioScience Inc (Acq 2010)
  - Avila Therapeutics, Inc (Acq 2012)
  - Quanticel (Acq 2015)
  - Receptos (Acq 2015)
  - EngMab AG (Acq 2016)
  - Delinia (Acq 2017)
  - Impact Biomedicines (Acq 2018)
  - Juno Therapeutics (Acq 2018)
    - AbVitro (Acq 2016)
    - RedoxTherapies (Acq 2016)

=== Management history ===
In March 2016, Bob Hugin, the company's long serving CEO, retired from his position and took the role of executive chairman. Bob Hugin was succeeded in the CEO role by Mark Alles. At the same time, Jacqualyn Fouse was named as the company's president and COO; Fouse had joined the company in 2010 as the CFO. Effective June 30, 2017, Dr. Fouse resigned and was succeeded by Scott Smith, president of the company's Global Inflammation & Immunology Franchise, who joined the company in 2008.

== Finances ==
For the fiscal year 2017, Celgene reported earnings of US$2.539 billion, with an annual revenue of US$13.003 billion, an increase of 15.8% over the previous fiscal cycle.

Year	Revenue in mil. USD	Net income in mil. USD	Total Assets in mil. USD	Employees
2005	537	64	1,258	
2006	899	69	2,736	
2007	1,406	226	3,611	
2008	2,255	−1,534	4,445	
2009	2,690	777	5,389	
2010	3,626	881	10,177	
2011	4,842	1,318	10,006	
2012	5,507	1,456	11,734	
2013	6,494	1,450	13,378	5.100
2014	7,670	2,000	17,340	6,012
2015	9,256	1,602	26,964	6,971
2016	11,229	1,999	28,086	7,132
2017	13,003	2,940	30,141	7,467

== Products ==
Major products included Revlimid (lenalidomide) and Pomalyst (pomalidomide) and the immunology drug Otezla (apremilast).

Product Portfolio
Brand Name	Drug Name(s)	Indication	Date Approved (USA)	Partner
Alkeran	melphalan	palliative treatment of multiple myeloma and for the palliation of non-resectable epithelial carcinoma of the ovary	01-17-1964	GlaxoSmithKline
Alkeran	melphalan hydrochloride	the palliative treatment of patients with multiple myeloma for whom oral therapy is not appropriate	11-18-1992	GlaxoSmithKline
Thalomid	thalidomide	acute treatment of the cutaneous manifestations of moderate to severe erythema nodosum leprosum (ENL) and maintenance therapy for prevention and suppression of the cutaneous manifestations of ENL recurrences	07-16-1998	
Thalomid	thalidomide	(in combination with dexamethasone) treatment of patients with newly diagnosed multiple myeloma	05-25-2006	GlaxoSmithKline
Focalin	dexmethylphenidate hydrochloride CII	attention deficit hyperactivity disorder (ADHD) in children and adolescents	11-13-2001	Novartis
Focalin XR	dexmethylphenidate hydrochloride CII	attention deficit hyperactivity disorder (ADHD) in children, adolescents and adults	05-26-2005	Novartis
Vidaza	azacitidine	treatment of patients with refractory anemia, chronic myelomonocytic leukemia	05-19-2004	
Revlimid	lenalidomide	transfusion dependent anemia due to low or intermediate-1 risk myelodysplastic syndromes associated with a deletion 5 q cytogenetic abnormality with or without additional cytogenetic abnormalities	12-27-2005	
Revlimid	lenalidomide	(in combination with dexamethasone) treatment of multiple myeloma patients who have received at least one prior therapy	06-29-2006	

=== Product-related history ===
In July 1998, Celgene received approval from the FDA to market Thalomid for the acute treatment of the cutaneous manifestations of moderate to severe ENL.

In April 2000, Celgene reached an agreement with Novartis Pharma AG to license d-MPH, Celgene's chirally pure version of RITALIN. The FDA subsequently granted approval to market d-MPH, or Focalin, in November 2001.

In December 2005, Celgene received approval from the FDA to market Revlimid for the treatment of patients with transfusion-dependent anemia due to Low- or Intermediate-1-risk MDS associated with a deletion 5q cytogenetic abnormality with or without additional cytogenetic abnormalities. Focalin XR was later launched by Celgene and Novartis in 2005.

In May 2006, Celgene received approval for Thalomid in combination with dexamethasone for the treatment of patients with newly diagnosed multiple myeloma.

In June 2007, Celgene received full marketing authorization for Revlimid in combination with dexamethasone as a treatment for patients with multiple myeloma who have received at least one prior therapy by the European Commission.

== Pipeline ==
- Ozanimod is an oral, sphingosine 1-phosphate (S1P) receptor modulator that binds with high affinity selectively to S1P subtypes 1 (S1P1) and 5 (S1P5). Ozanimod causes lymphocyte retention in lymphoid tissues. The mechanism by which ozanimod exerts therapeutic effects in multiple sclerosis is unknown, but may involve the reduction of lymphocyte migration into the central nervous system. Ozanimod is in development for immune-inflammatory indications including ulcerative colitis and Crohn's disease.
- Celgene developed several products within several areas of research (MM, MDS, AML, Lymphoma, CLL, Beta-Thalassemia, Myelofibrosis, Solid Tumors, Inflammation & Immunology.

== Litigation ==
=== Antitrust allegations ===
In 2009, Dr. Reddy's Laboratories requested, and Celgene refused to provide, a samples of Celgene's anticancer drug THALOMID (thalidomide). Dr. Reddy's Laboratories sought the material for bioequivalency studies required to bring its own, generic, version of thalidomide to market. In response to the refusal, Dr. Reddy's Laboratories filed a Citizen's Petition with the FDA asking the Agency to adopt procedures that would ensure generic applicants the right to buy sufficient samples to perform bioequivalence testing of drugs that were subject to REMS distribution restrictions.

Celgene denied that it had behaved anti-competitively, arguing that the legislative history strongly suggested that Congress considered and rejected a proposed guaranteed access procedure like the one proposed by Dr. Reddy's. Celgene further argued that requiring innovator companies to sell their products to potential generic competitors would violate its intellectual property rights and subject it to liability risks in the event that patients were harmed in Dr. Reddy's studies.

In 2018, Celgene was at the top of a list of companies that the FDA identified as refusing to release samples to competitors to create generics.

Generic manufacturer Lannett Company initiated antitrust litigation that accused Celgene of using its REMS for THALOMID (thalidomide) to violate the anti-monopolization provisions of the Sherman Act. In early 2011, the district court denied Celgene's motion to dismiss. The case was set for trial beginning in February 2012, but the parties settled before the trial began, thereby postponing further judicial review of antitrust claims premised on alleged abuse of REMS distribution restrictions.

=== Fraud allegations ===
In July 2017, Celgene agreed to pay $280 million to government agencies to settle allegations that it caused the submission of false claims or fraudulent claims for non-reimbursable uses of its drugs Revlimid and Thalomid to Medicare and state Medicaid programs. In its July 2017 10-Q, Celgene disclosed that it resolved the matter in full for $315 million, including fees and expenses. The case was brought under the False Claims Act by Beverly Brown, a former Celgene sales representative.

=== Price increases ===
Celgene and BMS repeatedly raised the price of its primary drug, Revlimid, from $218 per pill in 2005 to $892 in 2023, while the cost to manufacture remained approximately $0.25 per pill throughout this period.

== See also ==
- Biotech and pharmaceutical companies in the New York metropolitan area
- Pharmaceutical industry in Switzerland
