= Methylamide =

In biochemistry, an N-methylamide (NME) is a blocking group for the C-terminus end of peptides. When the carboxyl group of the C-terminus is replaced with a methylamide, further elongation of the peptide chain is prevented. C-Terminal modified peptides are also useful for the modulation of structure-activity relationships and for modifying conformational properties of peptides. N-Methylamides can be prepared directly from solid phase resin-bound peptides.
