= Peripheral edema =

- Other names: Peripheral oedema, dependent edema
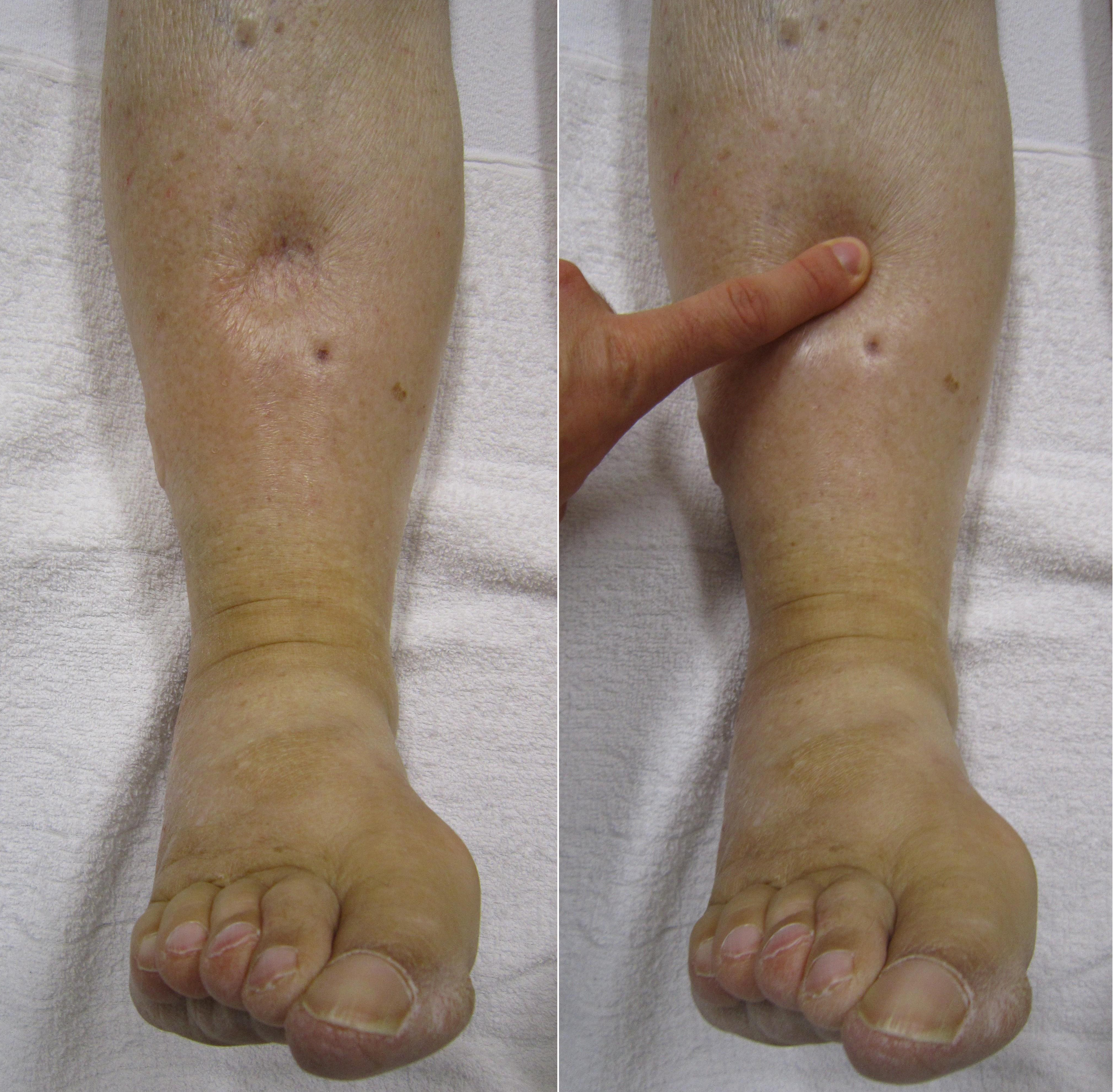
- Leg edema

Peripheral edema is edema (accumulation of fluid causing swelling) in tissues perfused by the peripheral vascular system, usually in the lower limbs. In the most dependent parts of the body (those hanging distally), it may be called dependent edema.

== Cause ==
The condition is commonly associated with vascular and cardiac changes associated with aging but can be caused by many other conditions, including congestive heart failure, kidney failure, liver cirrhosis, portal hypertension, trauma, alcoholism, altitude sickness, pregnancy, hypertension, sickle cell anemia, a compromised lymphatic system or merely long periods of time sitting or standing without moving. Some medicines (e.g. amlodipine, pregabalin) may also cause or worsen the condition.

== Prognosis ==
Successful treatment depends on control of the underlying cause. Severe swelling can cause permanent damage to nerves, resulting in peripheral neuropathy. Many cases from temporary or minor causes resolve on their own, with no lasting damage.
