= Pomalidomide =

Chemical compound

Clinical data
- Trade names: Pomalyst, others
- AHFS/Drugs.com: Monograph
- MedlinePlus: a613030
- License data: US DailyMed: Pomalidomide
- Pregnancy category: AU: X (High risk)
- Routes of administration: By mouth
- ATC code: L04AX06 (WHO)

Legal status
- Legal status: AU: S4 (Prescription only); BR: Class C3 (Immunosuppressive drugs); CA: ℞-only; UK: POM (Prescription only); US: ℞-only; EU: Rx-only

Pharmacokinetic data
- Bioavailability: 73% (at least)
- Protein binding: 12–44%
- Metabolism: Liver (mostly CYP1A2- and CYP3A4-mediated; some minor contributions by CYP2C19 and CYP2D6)
- Elimination half-life: 7.5 hours
- Excretion: Urine (73%), faeces (15%)

Identifiers
- IUPAC name: 4-amino-2-(2,6-dioxopiperidin-3-yl)-1H-isoindole-1,3-dione
- CAS Number: 19171-19-8
- PubChem CID: 134780
- IUPHAR/BPS: 7348
- DrugBank: DB08910
- ChemSpider: 118785
- UNII: D2UX06XLB5
- KEGG: D08976
- ChEMBL: ChEMBL43452
- CompTox Dashboard (EPA): DTXSID40893458
- ECHA InfoCard: 100.232.884

Chemical and physical data
- Formula: C_{13}H_{11}N_{3}O_{4}
- Molar mass: 273.248 g·mol^{−1}
- 3D model (JSmol): Interactive image
- Chirality: Racemic mixture
- SMILES: O=C1C=2C=CC=C(N)C2C(=O)N1C3C(=O)NC(=O)CC3
- InChI: InChI=1S/C13H11N3O4/c14-7-3-1-2-6-10(7)13(20)16(12(6)19)8-4-5-9(17)15-11(8)18/h1-3,8H,4-5,14H2,(H,15,17,18); Key:UVSMNLNDYGZFPF-UHFFFAOYSA-N

Pomalidomide, sold under the brand name Pomalyst among others, is an anti-cancer medication used for the treatment of multiple myeloma and AIDS-related Kaposi sarcoma. It inhibits angiogenesis, the formation of new blood vessels.

Pomalidomide was approved for medical use in the United States in February 2013, and in the European Union in August 2013. It is available as a generic medication.

== Medical uses ==
In the European Union, pomalidomide, in combination with bortezomib and dexamethasone, is indicated for the treatment of adults with multiple myeloma who have received at least one prior treatment regimen including lenalidomide; and in combination with dexamethasone for the treatment of adults with relapsed and refractory multiple myeloma who have received at least two prior treatment regimens, including both lenalidomide and bortezomib, and have demonstrated disease progression on the last therapy.

In the United States, pomalidomide is indicated, in combination with dexamethasone, for the treatment of people with multiple myeloma who have received at least two prior therapies including lenalidomide and a proteasome inhibitor and have demonstrated disease progression on or within 60 days of completion of the last therapy; and for the treatment of people with AIDS-related Kaposi sarcoma after failure of highly active antiretroviral therapy (HAART) or in people with Kaposi sarcoma who are HIV-negative.

== Side effects ==
Pomalidomide can cause harm to unborn babies when administered during pregnancy.

Pomalidomide is present in the semen of people receiving the drug.

== Pharmacology ==
=== Mechanism of action ===
Pomalidomide directly inhibits angiogenesis and myeloma cell growth. This dual effect is central to its activity in myeloma, rather than other pathways such as TNF alpha inhibition, since potent TNF inhibitors including rolipram and pentoxifylline do not inhibit myeloma cell growth or angiogenesis.

Pomalidomide works as a cereblon E3 ligase modulator.

== History ==
The parent compound of pomalidomide, thalidomide, was originally discovered to inhibit angiogenesis in 1994. Based upon this discovery, thalidomide was taken into clinical trials for cancer, leading to its ultimate FDA approval for multiple myeloma. Structure-activity studies revealed that amino substituted thalidomide had improved antitumor activity, which was due to its ability to directly inhibit both the tumor cell and vascular compartments of myeloma cancers. This dual activity of pomalidomide makes it more efficacious than thalidomide in vitro and in vivo.

=== Clinical trials ===
Phase I trial results showed tolerable side effects.

Phase II clinical trials for multiple myeloma and myelofibrosis reported promising results.

Phase III results showed significant extension of progression-free survival, and overall survival (median 11.9 months vs. 7.8 months; p = 0.0002) in people taking pomalidomide and dexamethasone versus dexamethasone alone.
