= Cereblon =

Protein in humans

CRBN

Identifiers
- Aliases: CRBN, MRT2, MRT2A, Cereblon
- External IDs: OMIM: 609262; MGI: 1913277; GeneCards: CRBN
Available structures
PDB	Ortholog search: PDBe RCSB
PDB	List of PDB id codes 4M91, 4TZ4, 5FQD, 5HXB

Gene location (Human)
Chr.	Chromosome 3 (human)
Band	3p26.2	Start	3,144,628 bp
Band	3p26.2	End	3,179,727 bp

Gene location (Mouse)
Chr.	Chromosome 6 (mouse)
Band	6|6 E1	Start	106,757,162 bp
Band	6|6 E1	End	106,777,038 bp
RNA expression pattern
Bgee	Human / Mouse (ortholog); Top expressed in: Achilles tendon; Brodmann area 23; skin of hip; biceps brachii; endothelial cell; Skeletal muscle tissue of biceps brachii; superficial temporal artery; tail of epididymis; middle temporal gyrus; corpus callosum / Top expressed in: pontine nuclei; spermatocyte; medial vestibular nucleus; medial dorsal nucleus; dorsal tegmental nucleus; lobe of cerebellum; ventral tegmental area; Region I of hippocampus proper; mammillary body; epithelium of small intestine; More reference expression data
BioGPS	n/a
Gene ontology
Molecular function	protein binding; metal ion binding
Cellular component	cytoplasm; Cul4A-RING E3 ubiquitin ligase complex; nucleolus; membrane; nucleus
Biological process	negative regulation of protein homooligomerization; positive regulation of protein homodimerization activity; protein ubiquitination; proteasome-mediated ubiquitin-dependent protein catabolic process; negative regulation of ion transmembrane transport
Sources:Amigo / QuickGO
Orthologs
Databases	NCBI: entry; OMA: entry
Species	Human	Mouse
Entrez	51185	58799
Ensembl	ENSG00000113851	ENSMUSG00000005362
UniProt	Q96SW2	Q8C7D2
RefSeq (mRNA)	NM_001173482; NM_016302	NM_021449; NM_175357
RefSeq (protein)	NP_001166953; NP_057386	NP_067424; NP_780566
Location (UCSC)	Chr 3: 3.14 – 3.18 Mb	Chr 6: 106.76 – 106.78 Mb
PubMed search
- Wikidata
View/Edit Human	View/Edit Mouse

Cereblon is a protein that in humans is encoded by the CRBN gene. The gene that encodes the cereblon protein is found on the human chromosome 3, on the short arm at position p26.3 from base pair 3,190,676 to base pair 3,221,394. CRBN orthologs are highly conserved from plants to humans.

== Function ==
=== Ubiquitination and role in development ===
Cereblon forms an E3 ubiquitin ligase complex with damaged DNA binding protein 1 (DDB1), cullin-4A (CUL4A), and regulator of cullins 1 (ROC1). This complex ubiquitinates a number of other proteins and marks them for degradation via the proteasome. Through a mechanism which has not been completely elucidated, this ubiquitination results in reduced levels of fibroblast growth factor 8 (FGF8) and fibroblast growth factor 10 (FGF10). FGF8 in turn regulates a number of developmental processes, such as limb and auditory vesicle formation. The net result is that this ubiquitin ligase complex is important for limb outgrowth in embryos.

At the molecular level, C-terminal cyclic imides have been identified as endogenous degrons recognized by cereblon. Cyclic imides can arise through spontaneous peptide-bond cleavage at asparagine or glutamine residues in aging proteins, and have long been observed in proteins such as α-crystallin. In 2022, C-terminal aspartimide and aminoglutarimide residues were shown to bind the thalidomide-binding domain of cereblon and to function as degrons promoting CRBN-dependent ubiquitination and proteasomal degradation.

In the absence of cereblon, DDB1 forms a complex with DDB2 that functions as a DNA damage-binding protein. Furthermore, cereblon and DDB2 bind to DDB1 in a competitive manner.

=== Regulation of potassium channels ===
Cereblon binds to the large-conductance calcium-activated potassium channel (KCNMA1) and regulates its activity. Moreover, mice lacking this channel develop neurological disorders.

== Clinical significance ==
=== Birth defects ===
The drug thalidomide binds to cereblon and changes which substrates can be degraded by it, which leads to an antiproliferative effect on myeloma cells and possibly the teratogenic effect on fetal development. Thalidomide was used as a treatment for morning sickness from 1957 until 1961 but was withdrawn from the market after it was discovered that it caused birth defects. It is estimated that 10,000 to 20,000 children were affected. However, the idea that cereblon modulation is responsible for the teratogenic activity of thalidomide in the chick and zebrafish was cast into doubt due to a 2013 report that pomalidomide (a more potent thalidomide analogue) does not cause teratogenic effects in these same model systems even though it binds with cereblon more strongly than thalidomide.

=== Intellectual disability ===
Mutations in the CRBN gene are associated with autosomal recessive nonsyndromic intellectual disability, possibly as a result of dysregulation of calcium-activated potassium channels in the brain (see below) during development.

=== Targeted protein degradation ===
Based on the finding that thalidomide and related analogues bind CRBN, heterobifunctional molecules were designed linking thalidomide to ligands for other proteins of interest. These molecules, termed proteolysis targeting chimeras (PROTACs) or protein degraders, recruit CRBN to a protein of interest, leading to its ubiquitination and subsequent degradation. This technology is being explored in clinical trials by a number of biotechnology companies such as Arvinas, C4 Therapeutics, and Kymera Therapeutics.
