= Targeted protein degradation =

Class of protein inhibiting drugs

Targeted protein degradation (TPD) is a drug design strategy that uses small molecules such as PROteolysis TArgeting Chimeras (PROTACs), molecular glues, or related approaches to induce the selective ubiquitination and subsequent proteasomal degradation of target proteins via the ubiquitin–proteasome system or other cellular clearance pathways. Unlike traditional occupancy-driven inhibition, TPD agents catalytically trigger irreversible loss of disease-modifying proteins, enabling the removal of target proteins to provide a sustained duration of action after transient engagement. This event-driven approach is being investigated for potential therapeutic applications in oncology, neurodegeneration, and other areas.

== Mechanism ==
Small molecule drugs, compounds typically <1 kD in mass, comprise a large portion of the therapeutic market. These drugs usually operate by agonizing or antagonizing the active site on a disease-linked protein of interest, though allosteric regulation is possible. With an estimated 93% of the human proteome lacking druggable binding sites, methods have been developed to modulate protein activity through binding of any available site rather than only the active site. These drugs contain a target protein binding warhead in addition to a linker-separated active domain. This domain may recruit a second protein to the proximity, induce protease-mediated degradation, or recruit a kinase for directed phosphorylation, among other functions. These drugs expand both the mechanism of action for small molecule therapeutics and the pool of potential protein targets.

== Event-driven pharmacology ==
In the field of targeted protein degraders (TPDs), event-driven pharmacology describes a mechanism of action by which a drug exerts its biological effect not by maintaining continuous occupancy of its target, but rather by initiating an irreversible downstream event, such as the proteolytic degradation of the target protein. This contrasts with traditional occupancy-driven pharmacology, in which drug efficacy depends on sustained binding.

TPDs act in a catalytic manner. Transient binding brings the target protein into proximity with an E3 ubiquitin ligase, resulting in its ubiquitination and subsequent degradation by the proteasome. Because the target protein is removed rather than merely inhibited, the pharmacological effect can persist after the TPD dissociates from the target or is cleared from the body, resulting prolonged duration of action at lower drug exposures.

== Proteolysis-targeting chimeras ==
Mechanism of an E3 ligase-targeting PROTAC

Proteolysis targeting chimeras (PROTACs) were first reported by Kathleen Sakamoto, Craig Crews, and Raymond Deshaies in 2001. A chimeric molecule consisting of ovalicin (a MetAP-2 small molecule inhibitor) and IκBα phosphopeptide (a recruiter of the SCFβ-TRCP E3 ligase complex) separated by a linker was constructed and shown to induce MetAP-2 degradation in in vitro cell models. Further study confirmed that E3 ligase-mediated ubiquitination and subsequent proteasome degradation was responsible for reduced MetAP-2 levels. Continued work on this system by Craig Crews and others has expanded the potential pool of E3 ligases and degradation targets with Arvinas Inc. founded in 2013 to bring PROTAC drugs to market. As of April 2023, Arvinas has one drug in Stage 3 clinical trials (vepdegestrant, an estrogen receptor degrader), and two drugs in Stage 2 clinical trials (androgen receptor degraders bavdegalutamide and luxdegalutamide) for treatment of breast and prostate cancer, respectively. Arvinas released Phase 2 clinical trial results for vepdegestrant in December, 2022.

As of May 2025, PROTACs in active development that have reached at least Phase II clinical trials:

| INN | Research code | Target | Indication | Developer | NCT number | Phase |
|---|---|---|---|---|---|---|
| Bavdegalutamide | ARV-110 | Androgen receptor | mCRPC (prostate cancer) | Arvinas | NCT03888612 | I |
| Vepdegestrant | ARV-471 | Estrogen receptor | ER+ advanced/metastatic breast cancer | Arvinas / Pfizer | NCT05654623 | III |
| Luxdegalutamide | ARV-766 | Androgen receptor | mCRPC (prostate cancer) | Arvinas | NCT05067140 | II |
| | BGB-16673 | BTK | B-cell malignancies (CLL, NHL, MCL) | BeiGene | NCT05006716 | I/II |
| Zelebrudomide | NX-2127 | BTK, IKZF1/IKZF3 | Relapsed/refractory B-cell malignancies | Nurix Therapeutics | NCT04830137 | I/II |
| Bexobrutideg | NX-5948 | BTK | B-cell malignancies | Nurix Therapeutics | NCT05131022 | I/II |

== SNIPERs ==
SNIPERs (Specific and Non-genetic IAP-dependent Protein Erasers) are chimeric small molecules that hijack the E3 ligase activity of inhibitor of apoptosis proteins (IAPs), such as cIAP1 and XIAP, to selectively induce the ubiquitin-dependent proteasomal degradation of target proteins. SNIPERs are a subclass of PROTAC degraders that specifically use IAP family ligases. Notably, SNIPERs often also degrade the IAP ligases themselves along with the intended targets, which maybe beneficial in cancer cells that overexpress IAPs.

== Molecular glues ==
Molecular glues are small molecules that promote targeted protein degradation by stabilizing interactions between E3 ubiquitin ligases and target proteins, enabling their ubiquitin-proteasome mediated breakdown. Unlike bifunctional PROTACs, they lack a linker and directly enhance weak protein–protein interactions, leading to degradation of the target protein. Their small size enables high cell permeability and oral bioavailability. While early examples, such as thalidomide analogs recruiting cereblon, were discovered by accident, mechanistic and structural insights are now starting to drive their rational design.

Key molecular glues in clinical trials
| Compound name | Target / Mechanism | Primary indication(s) | Most advanced phase | NCT number |
|---|---|---|---|---|
| Iberdomide (CC-220) | CRBN modulator, IKZF1/IKZF3 degrader | Multiple myeloma, lupus | Phase III | NCT04975997 |
| Mezigdomide (CC-92480) | CRBN modulator, IKZF1/3 degrader | Relapsed / refractory multiple myeloma | Phase III | NCT05552976 |
| Avadomide (CC-122) | CRBN modulator, IKZF1/3 degrader | NHL, DLBCL, solid tumors | Phase II | NCT03834623 |

== Hydrophobic tag degradation ==
Hydrophobic tag degraders contain a binding domain in addition to a linker-separated hydrophobic moiety, such as adamantyl, to induce protein degradation. An early example of a hydrophobically tagged degrader is fulvestrant, an estrogen receptor antagonist that contains a long hydrophobic side chain that induces the degradation of the estrogen receptor. Fulvestrant has inspired the development of additional selective estrogen receptor degraders (SERDs).

As exposed hydrophobicity is characteristic of protein misfolding, the native cell proteasome may recognize and degrade proteins tagged with the hydrophobic moiety. Taavi Neklesa and Craig Crews first reported hydrophobic tag degradation in 2011 as a tool to probe protein function in conjunction with cognate HaloTag fusion proteins. This principle has also been further used to effectively degrade transcription factors (a traditionally difficult class to drug) and cancer-linked EZH2 in in vitro models. As of yet, no drug candidates have been publicly identified making use of this technology.

== Alternative strategies ==
Lysosome-targeting chimeras (LYTACs) have been developed, combining target-binding compounds or antibodies and glycopeptide ligands to stimulate the lysosomal degradation pathway. Unlike the proteasome pathway, this enables the targeted degradation of extracellular and membrane-bound proteins in addition to cytoplasmic ones. Autophagy-targeting chimeras (AUTACs) can be employed to degrade proteins as well as protein aggregates and organelles. AUTAC degradation tags are typically derived from guanine though the particular mechanism of action is still unclear. Autophagosome-tethering compounds (ATTECs) mimic this strategy, directly appending a target protein to the autophagosome membrane for degradation absent the use of a linker. Phosphorylation-inducing chimeric small molecules (PHICS) employ the warhead-linker-recruiter structure to direct phosphorylation of a given target by proximity to a desired kinase. This technique does not necessarily involve protein degradation and may instead be used to modulate protein function to direct or inhibit certain pathways. Further work in the Crews Lab has used chimeric oligonucleotides, the dCas9 protein, and chimeric small molecules to create the TRAFTAC system for generalizable transcription factor degradation.

== Advantages ==
The ability to inhibit or modify enzyme function absent a catalytic pocket binding site target greatly expands the potentially druggable portion of the proteome. Furthermore, most classes of chimeric small molecules can act on many targets over their life cycle, lowering the effective dose compared to traditional inhibitors that act only on one protein at a time. These therapeutics provide an alternative mechanism of action that may be useful as a combination therapy in diseases where drug resistance is a concern. Chimeric drug activity is also highly dependent on distance between targeted proteins allowing effect to be effectively tuned through optimization of the linker structure.

== Challenges ==
The existence of two or more binding domains increases the difficulty of synthesis for chimeric molecules. Each component must be discovered, optimized, and synthesized in such a way that they can be linked together, driving up cost relative to single-domain inhibitors. The large size of chimeric molecules (typically 700-1100 Da) makes effective delivery difficult and increases complexity in pharmacokinetic design. Care must be taken to ensure that the molecule is capable of passing through the cell membrane and subsisting long enough to have therapeutic effect. Additionally, protein-protein ternary complexes are generally unstable, adding to the difficulty of chimeric drug design
