= Diverted total synthesis =

Diverted total synthesis in chemistry is a strategy in drug discovery aiming at organic synthesis of natural product analogues rather than the natural product itself. The target can be the modification of a natural product or the modification of an intermediate. In this sense it differs from other strategies such as total synthesis and semisynthesis. The purpose can be gaining a scientific understanding of the biological activity of the original natural product or the discovery of new drugs with the same biological activity but simpler to produce. The concept was introduced by Samuel J. Danishefsky in 2006. Notable examples of this strategy are the potential drug ixabepilone which is an analogue of the natural product epothilone B and carfilzomib which is derived from epoxomicin and eravacycline derived from tetracycline. Cabergoline is derived from a number of ergot alkaloids one of which is lysergic acid and Simvastatin is based on Lovastatin.

Ixabepilone	Ixabepilone
Ixabepilone	Epothilone B R=CH_{3}

Carfilzomib	Epoxomicin
Carfilzomib	Epoxomicin

Eravacycline	Tetracycline
Eravacycline	Tetracycline

Cabergoline	Lysergic acid
Cabergoline	Lysergic acid

Simvastatin	Lovastatin
Simvastatin	Lovastatin

Diverted total synthesis is a topic in academic research.
