= SD36 =

Identifiers
- IUPAC name: [[2-[[(5S,8S,10aR)-8-[[(2S)-5-amino-1-(benzhydrylamino)-1,5-dioxopentan-2-yl]carbamoyl]-3-[8-[2-(2,6-dioxopiperidin-3-yl)-1-oxo-3H-isoindol-4-yl]oct-7-ynoyl]-6-oxo-1,2,4,5,8,9,10,10a-octahydropyrrolo[1,2-a][1,5]diazocin-5-yl]carbamoyl]-1H-indol-5-yl]-difluoromethyl]phosphonic acid
- CAS Number: 2429877-44-9
- PubChem CID: 139600321
- ChemSpider: 88298462
- ChEMBL: ChEMBL4452527

Chemical and physical data
- Formula: C_{59}H_{62}F_{2}N_{9}O_{12}P
- Molar mass: 1158.167 g·mol^{−1}
- 3D model (JSmol): Interactive image
- SMILES: C1C[C@H](N2[C@H]1CCN(C[C@@H](C2=O)NC(=O)C3=CC4=C(N3)C=CC(=C4)C(F)(F)P(=O)(O)O)C(=O)CCCCCC#CC5=C6CN(C(=O)C6=CC=C5)C7CCC(=O)NC7=O)C(=O)N[C@@H](CCC(=O)N)C(=O)NC(C8=CC=CC=C8)C9=CC=CC=C9
- InChI: InChI=1S/C59H62F2N9O12P/c60-59(61,83(80,81)82)39-21-23-43-38(31-39)32-45(63-43)54(75)65-46-34-68(51(73)20-11-3-1-2-6-13-35-18-12-19-41-42(35)33-69(57(41)78)47-26-28-50(72)66-55(47)76)30-29-40-22-25-48(70(40)58(46)79)56(77)64-44(24-27-49(62)71)53(74)67-52(36-14-7-4-8-15-36)37-16-9-5-10-17-37/h4-5,7-10,12,14-19,21,23,31-32,40,44,46-48,52,63H,1-3,11,20,22,24-30,33-34H2,(H2,62,71)(H,64,77)(H,65,75)(H,67,74)(H,66,72,76)(H2,80,81,82)/t40-,44+,46+,47?,48+/m1/s1; Key:JKCSCHXVWPSGBG-OPKPGBGESA-N

SD36 is an experimental anticancer drug which acts as a proteolysis targeting chimera (PROTAC) against the protein STAT3, acting by targeting this protein for destruction by cell maintenance enzymes. It is widely used for research into the treatment of other cancers and the development of related drugs.

== See also ==
- ACBI3
- Bavdegalutamide
- Luxdegalutamide
- Vepdegestrant
