= Michele Pagano (biochemist) =

Michele Pagano is an Italian-American biochemist and cancer biologist best known for his work on cell cycle control and the ubiquitin-proteasome system. He is currently the chairman of the Department of Biochemistry and Molecular Pharmacology, and the Ellen and Gerald Ritter Professor of Oncology at the New York University School of Medicine. He is also an Investigator of the Howard Hughes Medical Institute. His laboratory has played a central role in elucidating the role of a family of enzymes, the cullin-RING ubiquitin ligases (CRLs), in mediating the proteolysis of key cellular regulators. In particular, his work has uncovered the molecular mechanisms by which CRLs control cell cycle progression, signal transduction pathways, and the DNA damage response. His work has also elucidated how the dysregulation of CRLs contributes to malignant transformation and metastasis, uncovering new therapeutic strategies.

== Biography ==
In 1990, Pagano earned his MD and a specialty diploma in molecular endocrinology from the University of Naples Federico II, where he first conducted basic research on the estrogen receptor. After completing his medical training, he first moved to the EMBL in Heidelberg, Germany, and then to Mitotix Inc., Cambridge, Massachusetts (a pharmaceutical startup that he co-founded and that pioneered the concept of CDK inhibitors as anti-cancer agents), where he carried out his postdoctoral studies under the mentorship of Giulio Draetta. As a postdoctoral fellow, Pagano first described the importance of cyclins and CDKs for DNA replication, and then the role of the ubiquitin system in controlling the cellular levels of CDK inhibitors. In 1996, upon completion of his postdoctoral studies, Pagano moved to the New York University School of Medicine as an assistant professor. He was appointed to the position of associate professor in 1999, tenured in 2003, and became full professor in 2005. In 2015, he became the chairman of the Department of Biochemistry and Molecular Pharmacology. He is also the co-founder of the biotechnology companies Mitotix Inc. and SEED Therapeutics. Mitotix was a pioneer in developing CDK inhibitors as anti-cancer agents and was later acquired by GPC Biotech. SEED Therapeutics, specializing in targeted protein degradation technologies such as PROTACs and Molecular Glues, was founded in collaboration with Dr. Ning Zheng from the University of Washington and Dr. Avram Hershko from the Technion Institute of technology.

== Honors and service ==
Since 1997, Pagano's laboratory has been funded uninterruptedly by the National Institute of Health. In 2008, he was named a Howard Hughes Medical Institute Investigator. He was also the recipient of other grants and awards, including an NCI MERIT Award (2006-2017) and an NIGMS MIRA Award (2020-2030) in recognition of his achievements in cell and cancer biology. In 2023, he was awarded the American Italian Cancer Foundation Prize for Scientific Excellence in Medicine. He serves on the advisory board of several pharmaceutical companies and foundations, and on the editorial board of several peer-reviewed journals in the fields of molecular oncology, cell biology, and cell signaling. Pagano has published over 200 peer-reviewed papers and has been issued 7 patents. He trained many predoctoral and postdoctoral fellows, most of whom have gone on to successful independent careers either in academia (e.g., UPENN, Columbia University, Weill Cornell, Boston Children's Hospital, University of Illinois College of Medicine, NYU, University of Oxford, Technical University of Munich, Sapienza University of Rome, University of Verona, and University of Tokushima) or in the pharmaceutical industry. Pagano's laboratory has always been open to people from all parts of the world for training and collaborative efforts. Among the most notable visiting scientists are the Nobel laureate Avram Hershko, who spent seven summer sabbaticals in his laboratory and with whom Pagano has co-authored 10 papers, and Yosef Shiloh, known for his discovery of the checkpoint kinase ATM, who spent a sabbatical year in his lab.
