= Craig M. Crews =

American scientist

- Born: June 1, 1964 (age 62)
- Education: University of Virginia; Harvard University
- Known for: Proteolysis Targeting Chimeras (PROTACs); Controlled Proteostasis; Carfilzomib
- Awards: AACR Award for Outstanding Achievement in Chemistry in Cancer Research (2017); Pierre Fabre Award (2018); RSC Khorana Prize (2018); Heinrich Wieland Prize (2020); Scheele Prize (2021); Jacob and Louise Gabbay Award (2023)
- Scientific career
- Fields: Chemical Biology
- Workplaces: Yale University
- Doctoral advisors: Raymond L. Erikson; Stuart Schreiber (Postdoctoral Advisor)

Craig M. Crews (born June 1, 1964) is an American scientist at Yale University known for his contributions to chemical biology. He is known for his contributions to the field of induced proximity through his work in creating heterobifunctional molecules that "hijack" cellular processes by inducing the interaction of two proteins inside a living cell. His initial work focused on the discovery of PROteolysis-TArgeting Chimeras (PROTACs) to trigger degradation of disease-causing proteins, a process known as targeted protein degradation (TPD), and he has since developed new versions of -TACs to leverage other cellular processes and protein families to treat disease.

At Yale University, he holds the John C. Malone Professorship in Molecular, Cellular, and Developmental Biology, and also holds joint appointments in the departments of Chemistry and Pharmacology. Crews founded, and is the Executive Director of, the Yale Center for Molecular Discovery.

== Education and training ==
Crews graduated from the University of Virginia in 1986 with a bachelor's degree in chemistry, after which he performed research at the University of Tübingen as a German Academic Exchange Service (DAAD) Fellow. As a graduate student in the laboratory of Raymond Erikson at Harvard University, Crews was the first to purify and clone the MAP kinase kinase MEK1, a key signaling molecule controlling cancer-driving cellular processes including proliferation and survival. Targeting MEK1 for the treatment of cancer has since been pursued by several biotechnology companies.

He subsequently worked in the research group of Stuart Schreiber as a Cancer Research Institute Fellow.

== Academic career ==
In 1995, Crews joined Yale University as an assistant professor in Molecular, Cellular, and Developmental Biology. His research has significantly advanced the field of chemical biology, especially in the area of targeted protein degradation. At Yale, he also serves as the executive director of the Yale Center for Molecular Discovery.

In December 2023, Crews was honored with the 2024 Kimberly Prize in Biochemistry and Molecular Genetics by Northwestern University Feinberg School of Medicine and the Simpson Querrey Institute for Epigenetics.

Crews has contributed to the development of induced proximity as a strategy in drug discovery. This approach involves bringing proteins into close spatial proximity to produce specific biological effects and is central to targeted protein degradation and related therapeutic methods. His work helped demonstrate the potential of this concept, particularly through the development of PROTACs (proteolysis-targeting chimeras), which use the cell's degradation system to remove certain proteins.

Crews received the Scheele Prize in 2021 and the Passano Award in 2025, the latter shared with Ray Deshaies for their contributions to the development of targeted protein degradation technologies.

== Research ==
Crews has pioneered the use of 'induced proximity' in drug development, specifically, controlled proteostasis, i.e., the pharmacological modulation of protein turnover. In 2001, Crews developed, in collaboration with Ray Deshaies, proteolysis targeting chimeras (PROTACs), a new technology to induce proteolysis. PROTACs are dimeric molecules that recruit specific intracellular proteins to the cellular quality control machinery (i.e., an E3 ubiquitin ligase) in a catalytic manner for subsequent removal by the proteasome. This technology has the potential to allow pharmacological targeting of proteins previously thought "undruggable" including many responsible for drug resistance in cancer. Excitement around the field has resulted in much private and public investment in therapeutic approaches based on targeted protein degradation. Prior to its work on PROTACs, the Crews lab's synthesis and mode of action studies of the natural product epoxomicin revealed that it is a potent and selective proteasome inhibitor. Subsequent medicinal chemistry efforts produced the epoxyketone containing proteasome inhibitor YU101, which served as the basis for the multiple myeloma drug carfilzomib.

Crews' initial research at Yale explored the synthesis and mode of action of the natural product epoxomicin, which revealed itself to be a potent and selective proteasome inhibitor via its epoxyketone pharmacophore. Subsequent medicinal chemistry efforts by Crews produced the epoxyketone-containing proteasome inhibitor, YU101.

In 2003, Crews co-founded the biotechnology company Proteolix to develop YU101, which ultimately served as the parent compound of multiple myeloma drug carfilzomib (Kyprolis). Based on successful Phase II trials of carfilzomib, Onyx Pharmaceuticals acquired Proteolix in 2009 and was itself acquired by Amgen in 2013. Carfilzomib was approved by FDA to treat multiple myeloma in 2012.

In 2024, Crews co-authored a study on the development of ligands and degraders targeting MAGE-A3, a melanoma-associated antigen expressed in various tumors. The research focused on designing small-molecule ligands capable of binding to MAGE-A3 and modulating its interaction with the RING E3 ligase TRIM28. This approach leverages targeted protein degradation technology to influence the ubiquitination and degradation of specific proteins, opening new possibilities for cancer therapy. This work exemplifies the growing potential of targeted protein degradation in the treatment of cancer and other diseases by specifically targeting tumor-associated antigens and their interacting E3 ligases.

== Induced Proximity ==
Crews' work on proteasome inhibitors ultimately inspired the concept of induced proximity, beginning with using heterobifunctional molecules, now known as PROTACs, to hijack the cell's degradation machinery to induce degradation of target proteins.

Crews' work in the field of induced proximity has led to the development of a number of investigational therapeutic candidates aimed at drugging proteins that are difficult to target using existing small molecule technology. A clinically advanced PROTAC, ARV-471, is being developed by Crews' company Arvinas and is the first induced heterobifunctional proximity molecule to demonstrate clinical proof-of-concept.

He and collaborator Ray Deshaies first developed the PROTAC concept in 2001. PROTACs are heterobifunctional molecules that initiate proteasome-dependent removal of specific proteins by simultaneously binding the protein and a ubiquitin ligase (i.e., an E3 ubiquitin ligase). The induced proximity of target and ligase catalyzes ubiquitination of the target protein, tagging the target protein for recognition by the proteasome. PROTACs have the potential to allow pharmacological targeting of proteins previously thought "undruggable", such as those with inaccessible or non-selective active sites, including many responsible for drug resistance in cancer.

== Biotechnology companies ==
Crews has founded two biotechnology companies to develop TACs discovered in his Yale research lab, each of which induces protein-protein interactions within distinct target classes to achieve a therapeutic effect.

In 2013, Crews founded New Haven-based Arvinas, which uses the PROTAC technology discovered in his lab to develop drugs to treat cancer, neurodegeneration, and other diseases. Notably, Arvinas' PROTAC drugs have successfully demonstrated oral availability in clinical trials, overcoming a key challenge faced by PROTACs-based drug development since conception, owing to their atypically large size and pharmacological properties.

As of 2023, Arvinas has four PROTAC therapies in clinical trials. The most advanced is vepdegestrant (ARV-471), a PROTAC targeting the Estrogen Receptor, in Phase 3 trials to treat metastatic breast cancer. In 2021, Arvinas and Pfizer, Inc. partnered to co-develop vepdegestrant. Phase 1/2 data have shown promising safety, tolerability, and pharmacokinetics for both drugs, and both drugs appeared to be well tolerated . Moreover, ongoing clinical trials have demonstrated evidence of efficacy in breast tumors with mutated estrogen receptor.

In 2019, Crews founded Halda Therapeutics, a venture-backed biotech company that is developing RIPTACs, or Regulated Induced Proximity Targeting Chimeras, for the treatment of cancer. Unlike PROTACs, RIPTACs do not directly elicit degradation of a target protein. Instead, RIPTACs induce the formation of a stable complex between a target protein selectively expressed in cancer tissue and a more widely expressed protein essential for cell survival. The resulting cooperative protein:protein interaction (PPI) abrogates the function of the essential protein, thus leading to the death of cancer cells expressing the target protein.

In August 2024, Halda Therapeutics, a biotechnology company founded by Crews, secured $126 million in a Series B extension financing. This funding aims to advance Halda's proprietary RIPTAC (Regulated Induced Proximity Targeting Chimeras) platform, which employs a "hold and kill" mechanism to selectively target and eliminate cancer cells. The company initiated a Phase 1 clinical trial for its lead candidate, HLD-0915, in patients with metastatic castration-resistant prostate cancer in January 2025.

== Publications ==
- Sakamoto KM, Kim KB, Kumagai A, Mercurio F, Crews CM, Deshaies RJ (July 2001). "Protacs: chimeric molecules that target proteins to the Skp1-Cullin-F box complex for ubiquitination and degradation". Proceedings of the National Academy of Sciences of the United States of America. 98 (15): 8554–9. Bibcode:2001PNAS...98.8554S. doi:10.1073/pnas.141230798. PMC 37474. PMID 11438690.
- Crews, C. M.; Alessandrini, A.; Erikson, R. L. (October 16, 1992). "The primary structure of MEK, a protein kinase that phosphorylates the ERK gene product". Science. 258 (5081): 478–480. Bibcode:1992Sci...258..478C. doi:10.1126/science.1411546. ISSN 0036-8075. PMID 1411546.
- Meng, L.; Mohan, R.; Kwok, B. H.; Elofsson, M.; Sin, N.; Crews, C. M. (August 31, 1999). "Epoxomicin, a potent and selective proteasome inhibitor, exhibits in vivo antiinflammatory activity". Proceedings of the National Academy of Sciences of the United States of America. 96 (18): 10403–10408. Bibcode:1999PNAS...9610403M. doi:10.1073/pnas.96.18.10403. ISSN 0027-8424. PMC 17900. PMID 10468620.
- Lai, Ashton C.; Crews, Craig M. (2017). "Induced protein degradation: an emerging drug discovery paradigm". Nature Reviews. Drug Discovery. 16 (2): 101–114. Bibcode:2017NRvDD..16..101L. doi:10.1038/nrd.2016.211. ISSN 1474-1784. PMC 5684876. PMID 27885283.
- Bondeson, Daniel P.; Mares, Alina; Smith, Ian E. D.; Ko, Eunhwa; Campos, Sebastien; Miah, Afjal H.; Mulholland, Katie E.; Routly, Natasha; Buckley, Dennis L.; Gustafson, Jeffrey L.; Zinn, Nico; Grandi, Paola; Shimamura, Satoko; Bergamini, Giovanna; Faelth-Savitski, Maria (2015). "Catalytic in vivo protein knockdown by small-molecule PROTACs". Nature Chemical Biology. 11 (8): 611–617. doi:10.1038/nchembio.1858. ISSN 1552-4469. PMC 4629852. PMID 26075522.

== Awards and recognition ==
- 1996-1999: Burroughs Wellcome Fund New Investigator Award
- 1996-1999: Donaghue Foundation New Investigator Award
- 1996-1998: CaPCURE Award (Assoc. for the Cure of Cancer of the Prostate)
- 2005: Fellow of the Royal Society of Chemistry
- 2005: Friedrich Wilhelm Bessel Award, Alexander von Humboldt Foundation
- 2011: Senior Scholar Award, Ellison Medical Foundation
- 2013: Fellow, American Association for the Advancement of Science (AAAS)
- 2013: Entrepreneur of the Year, Connecticut United for Research Excellence
- 2014: UCB-Ehrlich Award for Excellence in Medicinal Chemistry (European Federation of Medicinal Chemistry)
- 2015: Outstanding Investigator Award (R35), National Cancer Institute
- 2015: 2015 Translational Research Prize, Yale Cancer Center
- 2017: Award for Outstanding Achievement in Chemistry in Cancer Research, American Association for Cancer Research (AACR)
- 2018: Khorana Prize, Royal Society of Chemistry
- 2018: Pierre Fabre Award for Therapeutic Innovation
- 2019: American Cancer Society Professorship
- 2019: Pharmacia-ASPET Award for Experimental Therapeutics
- 2019: John C. Malone Professor of Molecular, Cellular, & Developmental Biology
- 2020: Heinrich Wieland Prize, Boehringer Ingelheim Foundation
- 2021: Scheele Prize, Swedish Pharmaceutical Society
- 2021: Honorary Doctoral Degree, Technische Universität Dortmund, Germany (doctor rerum naturalium honoris causa)
- 2022: Connecticut Medal of Technology, CT Academy of Science and Engineering
- 2023: Jacob and Louise Gabbay Award in Biotechnology and Medicine, Brandeis University
- 2023: Bristol Myers Squibb Award in Enzyme Chemistry, American Chemical Society
- 2024: IUPAC-Richter Prize in Medicinal Chemistry
- 2025: Passano Award
