= Zelebrudomide =

Clinical data
- Other names: NX-2127

Identifiers
- IUPAC name: 3-[4-[1-[[(3S)-1-[2-(2,6-dioxopiperidin-3-yl)-1,3-dioxoisoindol-5-yl]pyrrolidin-3-yl]methyl]piperidin-4-yl]anilino]-5-piperidin-1-ylpyrazine-2-carboxamide
- CAS Number: 2416131-46-7
- PubChem CID: 146559796
- ChemSpider: 128922006
- UNII: LSC67HA8DE

Chemical and physical data
- Formula: C_{39}H_{45}N_{9}O_{5}
- Molar mass: 719.847 g·mol^{−1}
- 3D model (JSmol): Interactive image
- SMILES: C1CCN(CC1)C2=CN=C(C(=N2)NC3=CC=C(C=C3)C4CCN(CC4)C[C@@H]5CCN(C5)C6=CC7=C(C=C6)C(=O)N(C7=O)C8CCC(=O)NC8=O)C(=O)N
- InChI: InChI=InChI=1S/C39H45N9O5/c40-35(50)34-36(43-32(21-41-34)46-15-2-1-3-16-46)42-27-6-4-25(5-7-27)26-13-17-45(18-14-26)22-24-12-19-47(23-24)28-8-9-29-30(20-28)39(53)48(38(29)52)31-10-11-33(49)44-37(31)51/h4-9,20-21,24,26,31H,1-3,10-19,22-23H2,(H2,40,50)(H,42,43)(H,44,49,51)/t24-,31?/m0/s1; Key:XLWJWCMQMBVNSG-ACXKHFGCSA-N

Zelebrudomide (NX-2127) is an investigational new drug that is being evaluated by Nurix Therapeutics for the treatment of relapsed or refractory B-cell malignancies such as chronic lymphocytic leukemia (CLL), mantle cell lymphoma (MCL), diffuse large B-cell lymphoma (DLBCL), and Waldenström macroglobulinemia (WM). It is an orally bioavailable proteolysis targeting chimera (PROTAC) designed to degrade Bruton's tyrosine kinase (BTK) along with the immunomodulatory proteins Ikaros (IKZF1) and Aiolos (IKZF3).
