= Utidelone =

Drug for treatment of breast cancer

Clinical data
- Trade names: 優替帝
- Other names: Epothilone D; desoxyepothilone B
- ATC code: L01DC05 (WHO)

Legal status
- Legal status: Rx in China

Identifiers
- CAS Number: 189453-10-9
- PubChem CID: 447865
- DrugBank: DB17575
- UNII: T0358E0YUF
- CompTox Dashboard (EPA): DTXSID70880053

Chemical and physical data
- Formula: C_{27}H_{41}NO_{5}S
- Molar mass: 491.69 g·mol^{−1}

Utidelone is a pharmaceutical drug for the treatment of metastatic breast cancer. It was approved for use in China in 2021.

Utidelone is a member of the epothilone class of natural products, which are metabolites produced by the soil-dwelling myxobacterium Sorangium cellulosum. It is also known as epothilone D.
