= C14H14N4O3 =

The molecular formula C_{14}H_{14}N_{4}O_{3} may refer to:

- Avadomide
- Obidoxime
