= Molecular glue =

Class of chemical compounds

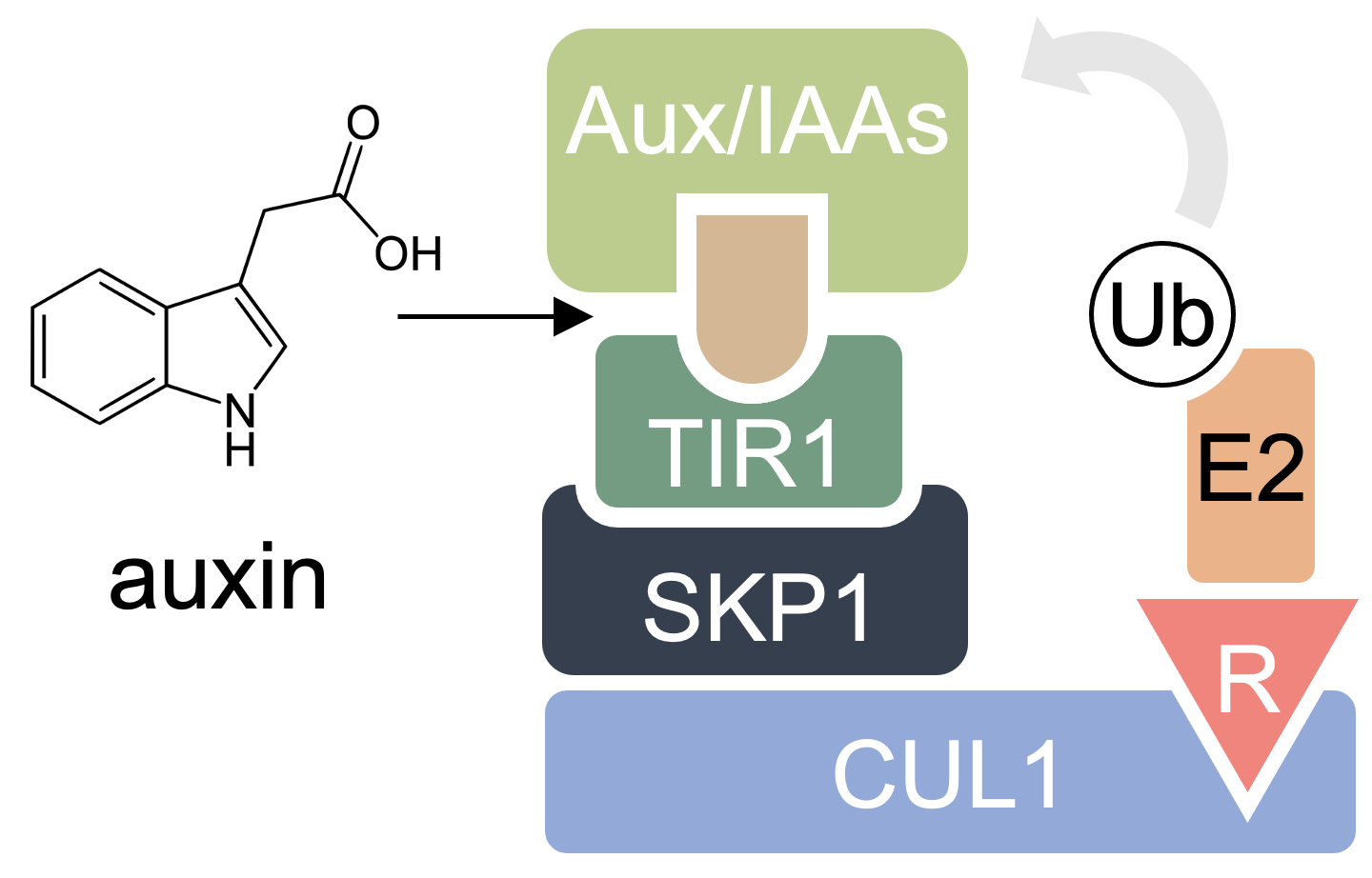
Auxin's mechanism of action, as first described by Ning Zheng, which led to the popularization of the term 'molecular glue.' Ub = ubiquitin; R = Rbx1; E2 = E2 ubiquitin-conjugating enzyme.

A molecular glue is a type of small molecule that modulates protein–protein interactions in cells by enhancing the affinity between proteins. These compounds can induce novel interactions between proteins (type I) or stabilize pre-existing ones (type II), offering an alternative strategy to traditional drug discovery. Molecular glues have shown promise in targeting proteins previously considered "undruggable" by conventional methods. They work through various mechanisms, such as promoting protein degradation or inhibiting protein function, and are being studied for potential use in treating cancer, neurodegenerative disorders, and other diseases.

Unlike PROTACs, which are rationally designed heterobifunctional molecules that contain two covalently linked ligands that bind respectively to a target protein and an E3 ligase, molecular glues are small, monofunctional compounds typically discovered serendipitously through screening or chance observations.

== Mechanism of action ==
Molecular glue compounds are typically small molecules that facilitate interactions between proteins by stabilizing or inducing protein–protein interactions (PPIs). These compounds often bind to specific binding sites on a target protein and alter its surface conformation, promoting interactions with other proteins that would not normally associate. By reshaping protein surfaces, molecular glues can stabilize protein complexes, reducing their tendency to dissociate, and thus modulate essential cellular functions, many of which rely on dynamic protein assemblies. Through this mechanism, molecular glues can alter the function, localization, or stability of target proteins, offering valuable applications in both therapeutic and research contexts.

Unlike PROTACs, which are bifunctional and physically tether the target to an E3 ubiquitin ligase, molecular glues induce or enhance PPIs between the ligase and the substrate by binding at existing or latent interaction surfaces. This mechanism allows for selective targeting of proteins, including those previously considered "undruggable."

A notable example involves small molecules that promote the interaction between the oncogenic transcription factor β-Catenin and the E3 ligase SCFβ-TrCP. These molecules function as molecular glues by enhancing the native PPI interface, resulting in increased ubiquitylation and subsequent degradation of mutant β-Catenin both in vitro and in cellular models. Unlike PROTACs, which require two separate binding moieties, these monovalent molecules insert directly into the PPI interface, simultaneously optimizing contacts with both substrate and ligase within a single chemical entity.

Molecular glues are especially advantageous for degrading non-ligandable targets, as they exploit naturally complementary protein surfaces to induce degradation without requiring high-affinity ligands for the target protein. Although many molecular glues have historically been discovered serendipitously and characterized retrospectively, newer approaches now aim to identify them prospectively through systematic chemical profiling.

For example, the compound CR8 was identified through correlation analysis as a molecular glue that promotes ubiquitination and degradation of specific targets via a top-down screening approach. This highlights the broader potential of small molecules, beyond PROTACs, in targeted protein degradation strategies.

There is also growing evidence that molecular glues can stabilize interactions beyond protein–protein pairs, including protein–RNA and protein–lipid complexes.

=== Functional types ===
Molecular glues are categorized into functional types based on their mechanisms of modulating protein-protein interactions (PPIs): stabilization of non-native (type I) or native (type II) protein-protein interactions.

==== Type I (non-native) ====
Type I molecular glues induce non-native protein-protein interactions that physically block, or "shield," a protein's normal endogenous activity. Rather than promoting protein degradation, these compounds typically stabilize inactive conformations or mask functional regions of the target protein, thereby preventing it from participating in its usual biological processes. This can include blocking active sites, disrupting ligand binding, or interfering with native protein–protein interactions.

One example is the immunosuppressant rapamycin, which forms a ternary complex with FKBP12 and the kinase mTOR, resulting in inhibition of mTOR activity. Another is cyclosporin A, which bridges cyclophilin A and calcineurin, leading to inhibition of calcineurin's phosphatase function. These cases illustrate how Type I molecular glues can modulate protein function by enforcing artificial protein interactions that hinder normal activity.

==== Type II (native) ====
Type II molecular glues stabilize endogenous protein-protein interactions by altering protein conformation or dynamics. They can either inhibit or enhance activity by locking proteins into specific states. One example is lenalidomide (an immunomodulatory drug), which binds cereblon (CRBN) and reprograms it to degrade transcription factors like IKZF1/IKZF3 in multiple myeloma. Other examples include tafamidis that stabilizes transthyretin (TTR) tetramers to prevent amyloid fibril formation in neurodegenerative diseases and paclitaxel that stabilizes microtubule polymers, blocking disassembly and inhibiting cancer cell division

=== Interaction mechanisms ===
Molecular glues employ two primary mechanisms to modulate protein-protein interactions (PPIs): allosteric regulation and direct bridging. Allosteric mechanisms dominate therapeutic applications of molecular glues because of their versatility in targeting diverse proteins and pathways.

==== Allosteric regulation ====
In allosteric regulation, molecular glues bind to one protein, inducing conformational changes that create or stabilize novel interaction surfaces, enabling the recruitment of a second protein. For example, lenalidomide binds to the E3 ligase cereblon (CRBN), remodeling its surface to recruit neo-substrates such as IKZF1/IKZF3 for ubiquitination and subsequent degradation. Similarly, CC-885 binds CRBN and induces the degradation of GSPT1 by stabilizing a ternary complex between CRBN, GSPT1, and the molecular glue.

==== Direct bridging ====
In contrast, direct bridging involves the glue physically linking two proteins at their interface. For instance, rapamycin bridges FKBP12 and mTOR by binding to both proteins simultaneously, forming a ternary complex that inhibits mTOR's kinase activity. While direct bridging is observed in some cases, allosteric modulation is far more common in molecular glues due to its ability to exploit dynamic protein surfaces and induce novel interactions without requiring pre-existing binding pockets.

== Applications ==
The ability of molecular glues to selectively degrade disease-relevant proteins has significant implications for drug discovery, particularly in the context of "undruggable" targets. Their monovalent nature and reliance on endogenous PPIs make them especially appealing for therapeutic development.

Compared to traditional small molecule drugs, molecular glues offer several advantages, including lower molecular weight, improved cell permeability, and favorable oral bioavailability. These properties align with Lipinski's rule of five and may enable more efficient delivery and distribution in vivo.

In contrast, PROTACs—though similarly used for targeted protein degradation—often face challenges such as high molecular weight, reduced cell permeability, and poor pharmacokinetic profiles, which can hinder their clinical development.

Several therapeutic molecular glues have been developed to target proteins involved in cancer and other diseases. For instance, small molecule degraders of BCL6 and Cyclin K exploit both ligand-binding and PPI surfaces to drive the formation of ternary complexes with E3 ligases. These compounds, typically under 500 Da, promote tight binding between ligase and neosubstrate in the presence of the glue and demonstrate high potency in cellular models.

As research continues to uncover new targets and refine discovery approaches, molecular glues are expected to play an increasingly important role in precision medicine and targeted degradation therapies.

=== Cancer therapy ===
Molecular glue compounds have demonstrated significant potential in cancer treatment by influencing protein-protein interactions (PPIs) and subsequently modulating pathways promoting cancer growth. These compounds act as targeted protein degraders, contributing to the development of innovative cancer therapies. The high efficacy of small-molecule molecular glue compounds in cancer treatment is notable, as they can interact with and control multiple key protein targets involved in cancer etiology. This approach, with its wider range of action and ability to target "undruggable" proteins, holds promise for overcoming drug resistance and changing the landscape of drug development in cancer therapy.

=== Neurodegenerative diseases ===
Molecular glue compounds are being explored for their potential in influencing protein interactions associated with neurodegenerative diseases such as Alzheimer's and Parkinson's. By modulating these interactions, researchers aim to develop treatments that could slow or prevent the progression of these diseases. Additionally, the versatility of small-molecule molecular glue compounds in targeting various proteins implicated in disease mechanisms provides a valuable avenue for unraveling the complexities of neurodegenerative disorders.

=== Antiviral research ===
Molecular glue compounds, particularly those involved in targeted protein degradation (TPD), offer a novel strategy for inhibiting viral protein interactions and combating viral infections. Unlike traditional direct-acting antivirals (DAAs), TPD-based molecules exert their pharmacological activity through event-driven mechanisms, inducing target degradation. This unique approach can lead to prolonged pharmacodynamic efficacy with lower pharmacokinetic exposure, potentially reducing toxicity and the risk of antiviral resistance. The protein-protein interactions induced by TPD molecules may also enhance selectivity, making them a promising avenue for antiviral research.

=== Chemical biology ===
Molecular glue serves as a valuable tool in chemical biology, enabling scientists to manipulate and understand protein functions and interactions in a controlled manner. The emergence of targeted protein degradation as a modality in drug discovery has further expanded the applications of molecular glue in chemical biology. The ability of small-molecule molecular glue compounds to induce iterative cycles of target degradation provides researchers with a powerful method for studying protein-protein interactions and opens avenues for drug development in various human diseases.

== Examples ==
=== Databases ===
Many databases exist to catalogue molecular glue complexes and known binders, including purpose-built databases like MolGlueDB and MGDB.

=== Type I ===
Induce non-native PPIs to block or inhibit target activity without degradation:

- Cyclosporin (Cyclophilin A-Calcineurin): Bridges cyclophilin A and calcineurin, inhibiting phosphatase activity via steric hindrance.
- RMC-7977 (Cyclophilin A-KRAS): Stabilizes a ternary complex (CYPA-KRAS-compound) to block KRAS-effector interactions, inhibiting downstream signaling without degradation.
- FK506 (FK506 (tacrolimus)) (FKBP12-Calcineurin): Forms a ternary complex with FKBP12 and calcineurin, suppressing phosphatase activity to prevent T-cell activation.
- Rapamycin (FKBP12-mTOR): Bridges FKBP12 and mTOR's FRB domain, inhibiting kinase activity by blocking substrate access.
- WDB002 (FKBP12-CEP250): Induces FKBP12-CEP250 interaction to inhibit centrosome amplification without degradation.
- NST-628 (RAF-MEK): Nondegrading glue that blocks RAF-MEK interactions, preventing MEK phosphorylation.
- NVS-STG2 (STING): Activates STING by binding between dimers but does not degrade the protein.

=== Type II ===
Redirect or stabilize PPIs to induce target degradation.

- Auxin (TIR1-Aux/IAA): Promotes TIR1-Aux/IAA binding, leading to Aux/IAA ubiquitination and degradation.
- BIO-2007817 (Parkin-phosphoubiquitin): Enhances Parkin-phosphoubiquitin interactions to promote substrate degradation (assumed degradative mechanism).
- 14-3-3/ERα Glues: Stabilize ERα-14-3-3 interactions, leading to ERα degradation (common degradative mechanism for 14-3-3 glues).

CRBN-Based Degraders:

- Lenalidomide [CRBN-IKZF1, IKZF3, CK1α] Reprogram CRBN to degrade transcription factors. (see also thalidomide, pomalidomide, mezigdomide, iberdomide, avadomide)
- CC-90009 [CRBN-GSPT1] Induces GSPT1 degradation via CRBN recruitment.
- E7820/Indisulam [DCAF15-RBM39, RBM23] Recruit DCAF15 E3 ligase to degrade RBM39/RBM23. [see also indisulam, tasisulam]
- CR8 [CDK12-DDB1] Links CDK12 to CRL4-DDB1 ligase, triggering CDK12-associated cyclin K degradation.
- PF-07208254 (BDK-BCKDH E2) Degrades branched-chain ketoacid dehydrogenase (BCKDH) via BDK recruitment (assumed degradative).
- SRI-41315 (eRF1-ribosome) Promotes eRF1-ribosome interactions to degrade translationally stalled proteins.
- BI-3802 [(BCL6) Induces BCL6 polymerization and proteasomal degradation.
- AMPTX-1 (BRD9-DCAF16) Recruits DCAF16 E3 ligase to degrade BRD9.
- dGEM3 (V) HL-GEMIN3] Links GEMIN3 to VHL E3 ligase for degradation.
- NVP-DKY709 [CRBN-IKZF2] (see also PLX-4545)
- DEG-35 [CRBN-IKZF2, CK1α]
- SJ3149 [CRBN-IKZF1, IKZF3, CK1α]
- dWIZ [CRBN-WIZ]
- SP-3164 [CRBN-IKZF3] (see also DRX-164)
