= Michele Pagano =

Michele Pagano may refer to:

- Michele Pagano (painter)
- Michele Pagano (biochemist)
