= Ning Zheng =

American biochemist and structural biologist

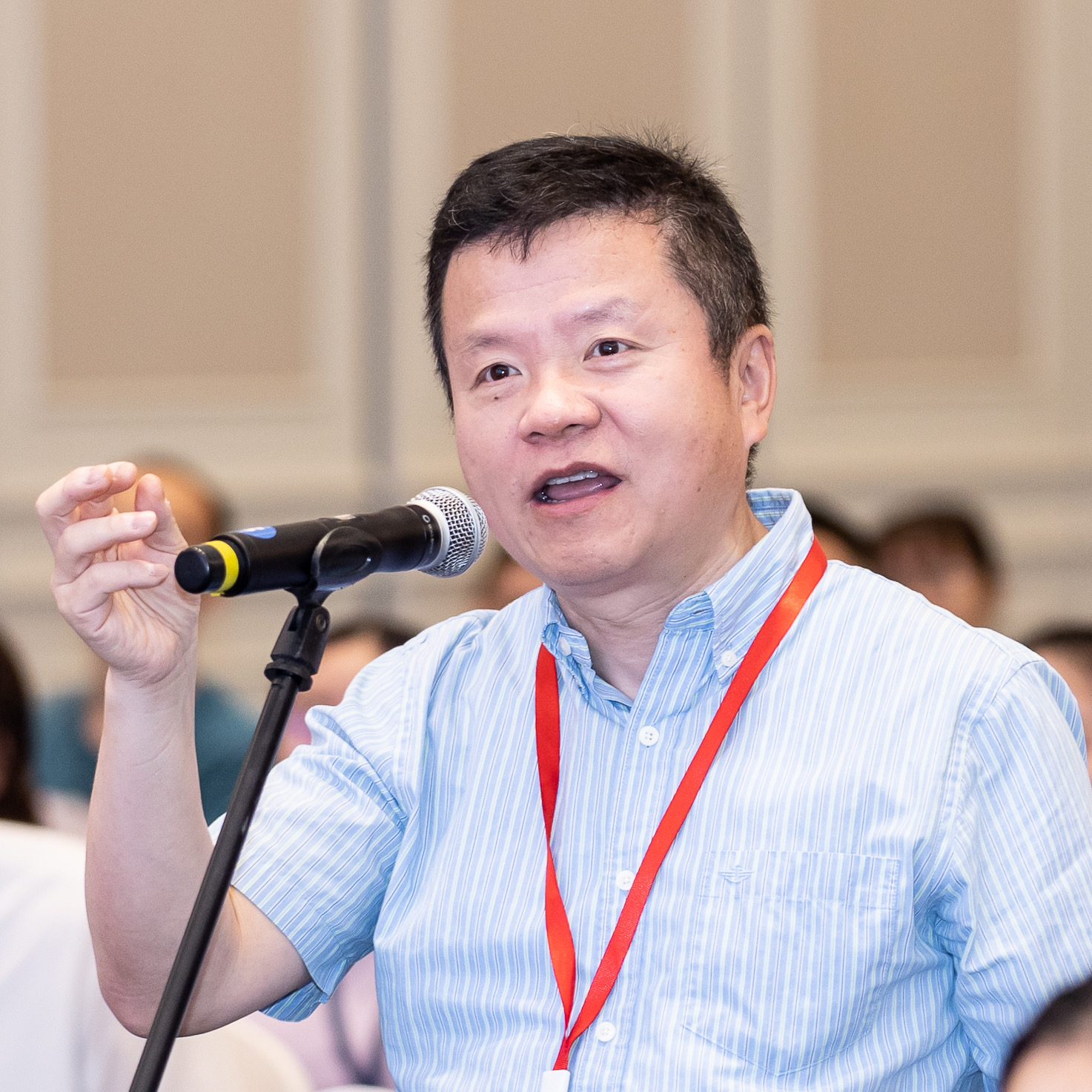
- Ning Zheng in 2024
- Education: Fudan University; UT Southwestern
- Known for: Molecular glues; Targeted protein degradation; Ubiquitin ligases
- Awards: Pew Scholar Award; Burroughs Welcome Investigator Award; Howard Hughes Medical Institute Investigator; Fellow of the American Association for the Advancement of Science
- Scientific career
- Workplaces: University of Washington Howard Hughes Medical Institute
- Thesis: A Tale of Two Ligands: Signal Sequence Recognition by E. coli Signal Sequence Recognition Particle with its Indispensable RNA Component (1997)
- Doctoral advisor: Lila Gierasch
- Other academic advisors: Nikola Pavletich
- Website: https://depts.washington.edu/zhenglab/

Ning Zheng is an experimental structural biologist and protein biochemist known for his pioneering work in the fields of molecular glues and targeted protein degradation. He is currently a professor in the Department of Pharmacology at the University of Washington School of Medicine and a Howard Hughes Medical Institute (HHMI) Investigator.

== Education and training ==
The son of a Chinese biochemistry professor, Ning Zheng obtained his Ph.D. in 1997 from the University of Texas Southwestern Medical Center.

He completed his postdoctoral studies at the Memorial Sloan-Kettering Cancer Center under the mentorship of Nikola Pavletich, where he published two seminal studies on the atomic structures of prototypical human ubiquitin ligase complexes. These studies laid the foundation for his subsequent research and contributions to structural biology and protein ubiquitination.

== Research ==
Ning Zheng’s research focuses on the molecular and structural mechanisms by which protein-protein interactions regulate eukaryotic biology and human diseases. His laboratory has made significant contributions to understanding the cullin-RING superfamily of E3 ubiquitin ligases, which is implicated in a myriad of cellular functions such as signal transduction, cell cycle regulation, transcriptional control, and DNA repair.

Zheng's recent studies have expanded to several areas of life sciences, including protein degradation, plant hormone signaling, circadian clock regulation, chromatin modification, and the structure-function relationships of ion channels and transporters. His groundbreaking work on the perception mechanism of the plant hormone auxin led to the introduction of the concept of "molecular glue." This concept describes how monovalent small molecules can promote protein-protein interactions by complementing protein interfaces, facilitating targeted-protein degradation. This conceptual advance has become instrumental in the development of novel therapeutic compounds for targeting disease-causing proteins considered undruggable. His laboratory is actively involved in drug discovery programs aimed at treating challenging human diseases, such as cancers and neurodegenerative disorders.

== Awards and recognition ==
Throughout his career, Ning Zheng has received numerous accolades. After joining the faculty of Pharmacology at the University of Washington, he was awarded the Pew Scholar Award and the Burroughs Welcome Investigator Award in Pathogenesis of Infectious Diseases. In 2008, he became a Howard Hughes Medical Institute Investigator. He was promoted to Professor in 2012. His significant contributions to science have been recognized through his election as a Fellow of the American Association for the Advancement of Science (AAAS) in 2015 and as a member of the Washington State Academy of Science in 2020.

== Selected publications ==
- Yeo, M.J.R., Zhang, O., Xie, X. et al. UM171 glues asymmetric CRL3–HDAC1/2 assembly to degrade CoREST corepressors. Nature 639, 232-240 (2025). https://doi.org/10.1038/s41586-024-08532-4
- Cao, S., Garcia, S.F., Shi, H. et al. Recognition of BACH1 quaternary structure degrons by two F-box proteins under oxidative stress. Cell, Volume 187, Issue 26, 7568 - 7584.e22 (2024). https://doi.org/10.1016/j.cell.2024.10.012
- Cao, S., Kang, S., Mao, H. et al. Defining molecular glues with a dual-nanobody cannabidiol sensor. Nat Commun 13, 815 (2022). https://doi.org/10.1038/s41467-022-28507-1
- Sheard, L., Tan, X., Mao, H. et al. Jasmonate perception by inositol-phosphate-potentiated COI1–JAZ co-receptor. Nature 468, 400–405 (2010). https://doi.org/10.1038/nature09430
- Tan, X., Calderon-Villalobos, L., Sharon, M. et al. Mechanism of auxin perception by the TIR1 ubiquitin ligase. Nature 446, 640–645 (2007). https://doi.org/10.1038/nature05731
- Angers, S., Li, T., Yi, X. et al. Molecular architecture and assembly of the DDB1–CUL4A ubiquitin ligase machinery. Nature 443, 590–593 (2006). https://doi.org/10.1038/nature05175
- Goldenberg, S.J., Cascio, T.C., Shumway, S.D. et al. Structure of the Cand1-Cul1-Roc1 complex reveals regulatory mechanisms for the assembly of the multisubunit cullin-dependent ubiquitin ligases. Cell, 12;119(4):517-28. (2004). https://doi.org/10.1016/j.cell.2004.10.019
- Zheng, N., Schulman, B., Song, L. et al. Structure of the Cul1–Rbx1–Skp1–F boxSkp2 SCF ubiquitin ligase complex. Nature 416, 703–709 (2002). https://doi.org/10.1038/416703a
