= BGB-16673 =

Identifiers
- IUPAC name: 3-tert-butyl-N-[(1R)-1-[4-[6-[6-[4-[[1-[4-(2,6-dioxopiperidin-3-yl)phenyl]piperidin-4-yl]methyl]piperazin-1-yl]-3-pyridinyl]-7H-pyrrolo[2,3-d]pyrimidin-4-yl]-2-methylphenyl]ethyl]-1,2,4-oxadiazole-5-carboxamide
- CAS Number: 2736508-94-2
- PubChem CID: 166522043
- ChemSpider: 129920751

Chemical and physical data
- Formula: C_{48}H_{55}N_{11}O_{4}
- Molar mass: 850.041 g·mol^{−1}
- 3D model (JSmol): Interactive image
- SMILES: CC1=C(C=CC(=C1)C2=C3C=C(NC3=NC=N2)C4=CN=C(C=C4)N5CCN(CC5)CC6CCN(CC6)C7=CC=C(C=C7)C8CCC(=O)NC8=O)[C@@H](C)NC(=O)C9=NC(=NO9)C(C)(C)C
- InChI: InChI=InChI=1S/C48H55N11O4/c1-29-24-33(8-12-36(29)30(2)52-45(62)46-55-47(56-63-46)48(3,4)5)42-38-25-39(53-43(38)51-28-50-42)34-9-14-40(49-26-34)59-22-20-57(21-23-59)27-31-16-18-58(19-17-31)35-10-6-32(7-11-35)37-13-15-41(60)54-44(37)61/h6-12,14,24-26,28,30-31,37H,13,15-23,27H2,1-5H3,(H,52,62)(H,50,51,53)(H,54,60,61)/t30-,37?/m1/s1; Key:UZDXDTMDMLTEJR-XNAWBMTISA-N

BGB-16673 is an investigational new drug that is being evaluated by BeOne Medicines for the treatment of relapsed and refractory B-cell malignancies, including chronic lymphocytic leukemia (CLL), mantle cell lymphoma, and other lymphomas. BGB-16673 is a proteolysis targeting chimera (PROTAC) that acts by using the ubiquitin-proteasome system to target Bruton's tyrosine kinase (BTK) for degradation.
