= Sagopilone =

New Epothilone

Names
- IUPAC name (1S,3S,7S,10R,11S,12S,16R)-7,11-dihydroxy-8,8,12,16-tetramethyl-3-(2-methyl-1,3-benzothiazol-5-yl)-10-prop-2-enyl-4,17-dioxabicyclo[14.1.0]heptadecane-5,9-dione

Identifiers
CAS Number	305841-29-6
3D model (JSmol)	Interactive image
ChEBI	CHEBI:177512
ChEMBL	ChEMBL2304041
ChemSpider	9459163
DrugBank	DB12391
ECHA InfoCard	100.207.513
EC Number	682-320-6
KEGG	D09721
PubChem CID	11284169
UNII	KY72JU32FO
CompTox Dashboard (EPA)	DTXSID30952866
- InChI: InChI=1S/C30H41NO6S/c1-7-9-20-27(34)17(2)10-8-13-30(6)25(37-30)15-22(19-11-12-23-21(14-19)31-18(3)38-23)36-26(33)16-24(32)29(4,5)28(20)35/h7,11-12,14,17,20,22,24-25,27,32,34H,1,8-10,13,15-16H2,2-6H3/t17-,20+,22-,24-,25-,27-,30+/m0/s1 Key: BFZKMNSQCNVFGM-UCEYFQQTSA-N
- SMILES: C[C@H]1CCC[C@@]2([C@@H](O2)C[C@H](OC(=O)C[C@@H](C(C(=O)[C@@H]([C@H]1O)CC=C)(C)C)O)C3=CC4=C(C=C3)SC(=N4)C)C

Properties
Chemical formula	C_{30}H_{41}NO_{6}S
Molar mass	543.72 g·mol^{−1}

Hazards
- GHS labelling
Pictograms	(GHS06: Toxic) (GHS08: Health hazard)
Signal word	Danger
Hazard statements	H300, H341, H361
Precautionary statements	P203, P264, P270, P280, P301+P316, P318, P321, P330, P405, P501
- Except where otherwise noted, data are given for materials in their standard state (at 25 °C [77 °F], 100 kPa). Infobox references

Sagopilone is a fully synthetic macrolide of the epothilone family with the molecular formula C_{30}H_{41}NO_{6}S. The mechanism of action is similar to taxanes, as they bind to the microtubule and prohibit cell division. These toxic properties and its possibility to cross the blood-brain barrier makes it a promising cancer medication.

== Substance class ==
Sagopilone, also known as ZK-EPO, belongs to the epothilones, which are derived from polyketides.

== Structure ==
Sagopilone is a 16-bond macrolide structure, a macrocycle with inner ester structure. With its C_{30}H_{41}NO_{6}S formula and a molecular weight of only 543.7 g/mol, classifying it as a low molecular-weight epothilone.

Sagopilone has structural and mechanistic similarities to epothilone, especially epothilone B. The mechanism of action is similar to that of taxanes. It binds to the microtubule of the cell and therefore, prevents cell division. Which makes it acutely toxic.

Sagopilone contains 2 hydrogen bond donors and 8 acceptors, 3 rotatable bonds, and 7 stereocenters.

== Biological effects and usage ==
Epothilones are a novel class of natural microtubule-stabilizing products. They show potential activity in an expanded spectrum of tumor indications.

Microtubules are polymeric structures composed of alpha- and beta-tubulin heterodimers. Sagopilone induces tubulin polymerization and therefore shows antitumor activity.

In the cell, sagopilone localizes predominantly to the cytoskeletal compartment. Sagopilone treated cells show mitotic abnormalities which lead to induction of cell cycle arrest at metaphase (in HCT116 cells). Induction of apoptosis follows together with mitochondrial transmembrane potential dissipation (activation of caspase-3 and - 9, mitochondrial cytochrome c release).

Sagopilone was tested in phase II clinical trials and has been shown to be clinically active in platinum-resistant and -sensitive ovarian cancer, NSCLC, prostate cancer, glioblastoma and melanoma.
