= Proteolix =

Defunct American pharmaceutical company owned by Onyx Pharmaceuticals

Proteolix, Inc.
- Company type: Private biotechnology company
- Founded: 2003; 22 years ago
- Founder: Craig M. Crews(Yale University); Raymond J. Deshaies(California Institute of Technology); Dr. Susan Molineaux(co-founder) Phil Whitcome(co-founder)
- Headquarters: South San Francisco, California

Proteolix, Inc., was a private biotechnology company with headquarters in South San Francisco, California. Proteolix was founded in 2003 based on technology developed by co-founders Craig M. Crews (Yale University) and Raymond J. Deshaies (California Institute of Technology). Susan Molineaux and Phil Whitcome joined as co-founders.

Proteolix was launched based on an $18.2 million A round comprising investments by Latterell Venture Partners, US Venture Partners, Advanced Technology Ventures, and The Vertical Group. Its lead product candidate, carfilzomib (PR-171), is a tetrapeptide epoxyketone for treating multiple myeloma, a blood cancer. The drug carfilzomib works by preventing proteasomes from breaking down other proteins. Proteolix focused primarily on the proteasome as a therapeutic target.

At the time of its sale (see below), the company had two earlier-stage programs, an orally-bioavailable proteasome inhibitor for oncology (PR-047), and an agent preferentially targeting the immuno form of the proteasome (PR-957), with potential utility in areas such as rheumatoid arthritis. At the time of sale, carfilzomib's route of administration was intravenous, and the company was exploring its potential utility in multiple myeloma, Non-Hodgkin lymphoma (NHL) and other cancers.

Proteolix was acquired by Onyx Pharmaceuticals in 2009 for $810 million (nominal value). PR-171 is sold by Onyx Pharmaceuticals as Kyprolis. Onyx renamed PR-047 to "ONX 0912" and PR-957 to "ONX 0914". Onyx Pharmaceuticals is a subsidiary of Amgen.
