= Raymond J. Deshaies =

American biochemist and cell biologist

- Born: September 25, 1961 (age 65); Waterbury, Connecticut
- Education: University of California, Berkeley (PhD); Cornell University (BS)
- Known for: Discoveries of cullin–RING ubiquitin ligases and elucidation of their mechanism of action and regulation, the JAMM family of ubiquitin isopeptidases, PROTACs (heterobifunctional small molecules that promote target degradation) the Sec61 translocon, and nucleolar sequestration as a regulatory mechanism. Founder of Proteolix, which developed carfilzomib/Kyprolis®
- Scientific career
- Fields: Biochemistry, Cell Biology
- Workplaces: Amgen; California Institute of Technology
- Doctoral advisor: Randy Schekman

Raymond Joseph Deshaies (born September 25, 1961) is an American biochemist and cell biologist. He is a board director or member of the scientific advisory board of several biotechnology companies and professor emeritus at California Institute of Technology (Caltech). Previously, he was distinguished fellow and senior vice president of global research at Amgen. Prior to that, he was a professor of biology at Caltech and an investigator of the Howard Hughes Medical Institute. He is also the co-founder of the biotechnology companies Proteolix and Cleave Biosciences. His research focuses on mechanisms and regulation of protein homeostasis in eukaryotic cells, with a particular focus on how proteins are conjugated with ubiquitin and degraded by the proteasome.

== Biography ==
Deshaies was born in Waterbury, Connecticut, on September 25, 1961. He graduated from Cornell University with a B.S. in biochemistry in 1983. He received his biochemistry doctorate from the University of California, Berkeley, in 1988 under the direction of Randy Schekman. He performed postdoctoral studies at Berkeley (1988–1990) and subsequently at the University of California, San Francisco (1990–1994) with Marc Kirschner. He started as an assistant professor at Caltech in 1994.

== Scientific contributions ==
Drug development: Deshaies, in collaboration with Craig Crews (Yale), conceived the idea of using heterobifunctional small molecules, referred to as PROTACs, to tether cellular proteins to a ubiquitin ligase, resulting in ubiquitination and degradation of the tethered protein. This concept underlaid the launch of numerous biotechnology companies including Arvinas, C4 Therapeutics, and Kymera. The Deshaies group also identified small molecules that inhibit targeting of substrates to the proteasome and removal of ubiquitin chains from substrates by Rpn11. In addition, they discovered (in collaboration with Dr. Hugh Rosen of Scripps and Frank Schoenen of University of Kansas) the p97 inhibitors DBeQ and ML240. ML240 served as the basis for the development of CB-5083, which entered human clinical trials in 2014.

Protein translocation: As a graduate student and postdoctoral fellow working with Dr. Randy Schekman at the University of California, Berkeley, Deshaies discovered Sec61, which comprises the heart of the translocon that mediates insertion of secretory and membrane proteins into the endoplasmic reticulum of all eukaryotic cells. He went on to identify a complex of proteins that form the translocon in yeast cells. In addition, Deshaies discovered a role for 70 kilodalton heat shock proteins (Hsp70s) in enabling the post-translational insertion of proteins into the endoplasmic reticulum and mitochondrial membranes. This was the first specific, genetically- and biochemically-validated function to be discovered for a member of the Hsp70 family of proteins.

SCF and cullin–RING ubiquitin ligases: As a postdoctoral fellow working with Dr. Marc Kirschner at the University of California, San Francisco, Deshaies discovered a biochemical function for the ubiquitin-conjugated enzyme CDC34, which he showed mediates conjugation of ubiquitin onto G1 cyclin proteins in yeast cells.

Upon starting his laboratory at Caltech, Deshaies studied the function of Cdc34 and how it relates to progression through the cell division cycle. These studies led his laboratory to discover the SCF complex SCF^{Cdc4}, which is the progenitor of what is now known to be a large family of ~250 enzymes known as cullin–RING ubiquitin ligases (CRLs) that are conserved throughout eukaryotes and exert a major impact on the regulation of numerous cellular and organismal processes. In parallel, they established the paradigm of phosphorylation-dependent targeting of SCF substrates. His lab went on to discover the critical catalytic subunit of SCF^{Cdc4} (known as Rbx1/Roc1/Hrt1) and describe its mechanism of action. Subsequent studies identified key aspects of CRL mechanism of action. Particularly notable were their discoveries relating to the CRL regulators COP9 signalosome (CSN) and CAND1. In 2001-2002, the Deshaies lab showed that CSN, together with proteasome subunit Rpn11/PSMD14, are the founding members of a novel family of deubiquitinating enzymes. CSN plays a key role in regulating SCF and other CRL enzymes by removing the ubiquitin-like protein NEDD8 from their cullin subunit. In 2013, they showed that Cand1 has the unusual property of being a ‘protein exchange catalyst’ that equilibrates F-box subunits of SCF ubiquitin ligases with the cullin scaffold subunit.

Proteasome: The Deshaies group pioneered the use of affinity purification to rapidly purify and characterize the composition of eukaryotic proteasomes, leading to the discovery of a large number of factors, including Rpn13 and Ubp6, that interact with the proteasome in yeast cells. In subsequent work they discovered that the Rpn11 subunit mediates removal of polyubiquitin chains from proteasome substrates as they are being degraded.

P97/VCP: Early studies on p97 by the Deshaies group revealed a proteomic interaction network that includes all known UBX domain proteins, as well as a large number of ubiquitin ligase enzymes, including multiple CRLs. These findings indicated that the biological roles of p97 were far broader than was thought at the time. This was followed by identifying novel functions for p97, including removal of proteins from chromatin as part of the DNA damage response and extraction of stalled, nascent polypeptides from the ribosome.

Exit from mitosis: In addition to their studies on protein degradation, the Deshaies lab worked extensively on cell cycle control from 1994-2005, including studies on the regulation of exit from mitosis. They established the key paradigm that exit from mitosis is governed by the release of the protein phosphatase Cdc14 from its nucleolar anchor protein Net1 in late anaphase, which is triggered by the action of the mitotic exit network (MEN). In later work, they established that an early step in the release of Cdc14 from Net1 is the phosphorylation of Net1 by the mitotic cyclin-Cdk complex

== Entrepreneurship ==
In 2003, Deshaies co-founded Proteolix with Dr. Craig Crews (Yale), Dr. Susan Molineaux, and Dr. Phil Whitcome (deceased), based on technology developed in the Crews and Deshaies labs. Dr. Lawrence Lasky, of Latterell Venture Partners, also played an instrumental role. Proteolix built on technology invented by Dr. Crews to develop carfilzomib/Kyprolis® through mid-phase 2 clinical trials before being acquired by Onyx in 2009. Kyprolis® was approved by the FDA in 2012 for treatment of multiple myeloma, and in 2013 Amgen acquired Onyx.

In 2011, Deshaies co-founded Cleave Biosciences with Dr. Seth Cohen (University of California, San Diego), Dr. Frank Parlati, Dr. Peter Thompson, and Dr. Laura Shawver, based on technology developed in the Cohen and Deshaies labs. Dr. Lawrence Lasky, this time at US Venture Partners, once again played an instrumental role. Cleave built on technology invented collaboratively by the Deshaies, Rosen (Scripps), and Schoenen (University of Kansas) laboratories to develop CB-5083, which is a potent and selective inhibitor of p97. CB-5083 entered human phase 1 clinical trials in 2014.

== Awards ==
- 2026 - Alexander Bodini Foundation Prize for Scientific Excellence in Medicine
- 2025 - Merz Visiting Professorship, Johann Wolfgang Goethe University, Frankfurt am Main
- 2025 - Laureate, Passano Foundation
- 2023 - Jacob and Louise Gabbay Award in Biotechnology and Medicine
- 2022 - Listed in Most Influential People in Biopharma - The Scientists by Fierce Pharma
- 2017 - Elected as a Fellow of the American Society of Cell Biology
- 2016 – Elected to the U.S. National Academy of Sciences
- 2011 – Elected to the American Academy of Arts and Sciences
- 2007 – Elected as a Fellow of the American Association for the Advancement of Science
- 1999 – ASCB–Promega Early Career Life Scientist Award
- 1997 – Beckman Young Investigator Award
- 1997 – Burroughs-Wellcome New Investigator Award
- 1995 – Searle Scholar Award
- 1990 – Lucille P. Markey Charitable Trust Scholar Award
