= DCAF15 =

Protein-coding gene in the species Homo sapiens

Identifiers
- Aliases: DCAF15, C19orf72, DDB1 and CUL4 associated factor 15
- External IDs: MGI: 2684420; HomoloGene: 18182; GeneCards: DCAF15; OMA:DCAF15 - orthologs

Gene location (Human)
Chr.	Chromosome 19 (human)
Band	19p13.12	Start	13,952,492 bp
Band	19p13.12	End	13,961,449 bp

Gene location (Mouse)
Chr.	Chromosome 8 (mouse)
Band	8|8 C2	Start	84,823,701 bp
Band	8|8 C2	End	84,831,397 bp
RNA expression pattern
Bgee	Human / Mouse (ortholog); Top expressed in: granulocyte; left testis; right testis; spleen; right hemisphere of cerebellum; apex of heart; blood; skin of leg; skin of abdomen; right uterine tube / Top expressed in: otic vesicle; spermatocyte; seminiferous tubule; otic placode; saccule; spermatid; epiblast; yolk sac; thymus; intestinal villus; More reference expression data
BioGPS	n/a
Gene ontology
Molecular function	protein binding
Cellular component	Cul4-RING E3 ubiquitin ligase complex; protein-containing complex
Biological process	protein ubiquitination
Sources:Amigo / QuickGO
Orthologs
Species	Human	Mouse
Entrez	90379	212123
Ensembl	ENSG00000132017; ENSG00000288453	ENSMUSG00000037103
UniProt	Q66K64	Q6PFH3
RefSeq (mRNA)	NM_138353	NM_172502; NM_001357322
RefSeq (protein)	NP_612362	NP_766090; NP_001344251
Location (UCSC)	Chr 19: 13.95 – 13.96 Mb	Chr 8: 84.82 – 84.83 Mb
PubMed search
- Wikidata
View/Edit Human	View/Edit Mouse

DDB1 and CUL4 associated factor 15 is a protein that in humans is encoded by the DCAF15 gene.

DCAF15 forms a complex with CUL4A or CUL4B that has E3 ubiquitin ligase activity and is responsible for the proteasome degradation of certain proteins.
