= Sorangium cellulosum =

Scientific classification
- Domain: Bacteria
- Kingdom: Pseudomonadati
- Phylum: Myxococcota
- Class: Myxococcia
- Order: Myxococcales
- Family: Polyangiaceae
- Genus: Sorangium
- Species: S. cellulosum

Binomial name
- Sorangium cellulosum (ex Jahn 1924) Reichenbach 2007

Species of bacterium

Sorangium cellulosum is a soil-dwelling Gram-negative bacterium of the group myxobacteria. It is motile and shows gliding motility. Under stressful conditions this motility, as in other myxobacteria, the cells congregate to form fruiting bodies and differentiate into myxospores. These congregating cells make isolation of pure culture and colony counts on agar medium difficult as the bacterium spread and colonies merge. It has an unusually-large genome of 13,033,779 base pairs, making it the largest bacterial genome sequenced to date by roughly 4 Mb.

== Ecology ==
S. cellulosum is found in soils, animal feces, and tree bark. The bacterium is a saprophyte deriving its nutrition from cellulose aerobically. It is a prolific producer of secondary fungicides and bactericides that reduce competition in soil environments. In lab samples, S. cellulosum grows on agar medium only when certain cell densities are plated. Quorum-sensing allows Sorangium to grow in communities sufficiently large to metabolize cellulose.

== Secondary compounds ==
Sorangium produces 50% of all known metabolites produced by myxobacteria. These include compounds that are antifungal, antibacterial, antibiotic resistant, or can even disable mammalian cells. These many compounds have sparked intense mining of its extensive genome in exploration of possible industrial and medical applications. Some of these secondary compounds include:

- Ambruticin and Jerangolid A - Antifungal agents.
- Chivosazol - a compound that destroys the actin skeleton of eukaryotic cells. It is effective against both fungal and mammalian cells.
- Epothilones - Compounds that target microtubule function leading to apoptosis. Some derivatives are used to treat human cancers.
- Myxochelin A - Antibacterial agent that acts by sequestering iron in the environment.
- Soraphen A - An agent highly effective against plant-pathogenic fungi. It was extensively researched for agricultural use until it was discovered to be a teratogen.

Industrial fermentation and genetic manipulation of S. cellulosum is challenging. Plasmids have been found to not function in S. cellulosum cells. Reproducible genetic alterations must be made directly into the single circular chromosome.

== Clinical use ==
Metabolites secreted by Sorangium cellulosum known as epothilones have been noted to have antineoplastic activity. This has led to the development of analogs which mimic its activity. One such analog, known as ixabepilone is a U.S. Food and Drug Administration approved chemotherapy agent for the treatment of metastatic breast cancer.
