= Ixabepilone =

Chemical compound

Clinical data
- Pronunciation: /ˌɪksəˈbɛpɪloʊn/ IKS-ə-BE-pi-lohn
- Trade names: Ixempra
- Other names: Azaepothilone B
- AHFS/Drugs.com: Monograph
- MedlinePlus: a608042
- License data: US DailyMed: Ixabepilone; US FDA: Ixabepilone
- Routes of administration: Intravenous infusion
- ATC code: L01DC04 (WHO)

Legal status
- Legal status: US: ℞-only

Pharmacokinetic data
- Bioavailability: N/A
- Protein binding: 67 to 77%
- Metabolism: Extensive, hepatic, CYP3A4-mediated
- Elimination half-life: 52 hours
- Excretion: Fecal (mostly) and renal

Identifiers
- IUPAC name: (1R,5S,6S,7R,10S,14S,16S)-6,10-dihydroxy-1,5,7, 9,9-pentamethyl-14-[(E)-1-(2-methyl-1,3-thiazol- 4-yl)prop-1-en-2-yl]-17-oxa-13-azabicyclo[14.1.0] heptadecane-8,12-dione
- CAS Number: 219989-84-1
- PubChem CID: 6445540
- IUPHAR/BPS: 6824
- DrugBank: DB04845
- ChemSpider: 20145579
- UNII: K27005NP0A
- KEGG: D04645
- ChEMBL: ChEMBL1201752
- CompTox Dashboard (EPA): DTXSID70870252
- ECHA InfoCard: 100.158.736

Chemical and physical data
- Formula: C_{27}H_{42}N_{2}O_{5}S
- Molar mass: 506.70 g·mol^{−1}
- 3D model (JSmol): Interactive image
- SMILES: Cc3nc(/C=C(\C)[C@@H]1C[C@@H]2O[C@]2(C)CCC[C@H](C)[C@H](O)[C@@H](C)C(=O)C(C)(C)[C@@H](O)CC(=O)N1)cs3
- InChI: InChI=1S/C27H42N2O5S/c1-15-9-8-10-27(7)22(34-27)12-20(16(2)11-19-14-35-18(4)28-19)29-23(31)13-21(30)26(5,6)25(33)17(3)24(15)32/h11,14-15,17,20-22,24,30,32H,8-10,12-13H2,1-7H3,(H,29,31)/b16-11+/t15-,17+,20-,21-,22-,24-,27+/m0/s1; Key:FABUFPQFXZVHFB-PVYNADRNSA-N

Ixabepilone (INN; also known as azaepothilone B, codenamed BMS-247550) is a pharmaceutical drug developed by Bristol-Myers Squibb as a chemotherapeutic medication for cancer.

== History ==
Ixabepilone is a semi-synthetic analog of epothilone B, a natural chemical compound produced by Sorangium cellulosum. The structural difference between Epothilone B and Ixabepilone consists of only a single atom oxygen-to-nitrogen substitution that converts the ester into an amide. Epothilone B itself could not be developed as a pharmaceutical drug because of poor metabolic stability and pharmacokinetics. Ixabepilone was designed through medicinal chemistry to improve upon these properties.

== Pharmacology ==
Much like Taxol, Ixabepilone acts to stabilize microtubules. It is highly potent, capable of damaging cancer cells in very low concentrations, and retains activity in cases where tumor cells are insensitive to taxane type drugs.

== Approval ==
On October 16, 2007, the U.S. Food and Drug Administration approved ixabepilone for the treatment of aggressive metastatic or locally advanced breast cancer no longer responding to currently available chemotherapies. In November 2008, the EMEA has refused a marketing authorisation for Ixabepilone.

Ixabepilone is administered through injection, and is marketed under the trade name Ixempra.

== Clinical uses ==
Ixabepilone, in combination with capecitabine, has demonstrated effectiveness in the treatment of metastatic or locally advanced breast cancer in patients after failure of an anthracycline and a taxane.

It has been investigated for use in treatment of non-Hodgkin's lymphoma. In pancreatic cancer phase two trial it showed some promising results (used alone). Combination therapy trials are ongoing.
