= RNF114 =

Protein-coding gene in the species Homo sapiens

Identifiers
- Aliases: RNF114, PSORS12, ZNF313, ring finger protein 114
- External IDs: OMIM: 612451; MGI: 1933159; GeneCards: RNF114
Enzyme activity
EC #	BRENDA	ExPASy	KEGG	MetaCyc
2.3.2.27	↗	↗	↗	↗

Gene location (Human)
Chr.	Chromosome 20 (human)
Band	20q13.13	Start	49,936,336 bp
Band	20q13.13	End	49,953,885 bp

Gene location (Mouse)
Chr.	Chromosome 2 (mouse)
Band	2|2 H3	Start	167,334,565 bp
Band	2|2 H3	End	167,358,093 bp
RNA expression pattern
Bgee	Human / Mouse (ortholog); Top expressed in: oocyte; secondary oocyte; left testis; right testis; pancreatic ductal cell; palpebral conjunctiva; sperm; muscle of thigh; epithelium of nasopharynx; monocyte / Top expressed in: zygote; secondary oocyte; primary oocyte; Paneth cell; renal corpuscle; blood; granulocyte; medial ganglionic eminence; Rostral migratory stream; medullary collecting duct; More reference expression data
BioGPS	n/a
Gene ontology
Molecular function	ubiquitin conjugating enzyme binding; ubiquitin protein ligase activity; metal ion binding; ubiquitin-protein transferase activity; transferase activity
Cellular component	cytoplasm; intracellular anatomical structure; nucleus; cytosol; plasma membrane
Biological process	multicellular organism development; cell differentiation; positive regulation of proteasomal ubiquitin-dependent protein catabolic process; protein ubiquitination; spermatogenesis; protein polyubiquitination
Sources:Amigo / QuickGO
Orthologs
Databases	NCBI: entry; OMA: entry
Species	Human	Mouse
Entrez	55905	81018
Ensembl	ENSG00000124226	ENSMUSG00000006418
UniProt	Q9Y508	Q9ET26
RefSeq (mRNA)	NM_018683	NM_030743; NM_001356496; NM_001360930
RefSeq (protein)	NP_061153	NP_109668; NP_001347859
Location (UCSC)	Chr 20: 49.94 – 49.95 Mb	Chr 2: 167.33 – 167.36 Mb
PubMed search
- Wikidata
View/Edit Human	View/Edit Mouse

E3 ubiquitin-protein ligase RNF114 is a protein that in humans is encoded by the RNF114 gene.
