= Onyx Pharmaceuticals =

American pharmaceutical company

Onyx Pharmaceuticals, Inc.
- Company type: Publicly traded
- Traded as: Nasdaq: ONXX
- ISIN: US6833991093
- Industry: Pharmaceutical
- Founded: February 1992; 34 years ago in So. San Francisco, Calif.
- Founders: Frank McCormick, Ph.D.; Kevin J. Kinsella
- Defunct: October 1, 2013
- Fate: Acquired by Amgen
- Headquarters: South San Francisco, California, United States
- Key people: N. Anthony Coles (CEO)
- Products: Sorafenib (Nexavar); Carfilzomib (Kyprolis); Regorafenib (Stivarga)
- Number of employees: 741 (2012)
- Website: www.onyx.com

Onyx Pharmaceuticals, Inc. was a pharmaceutical company headquartered in South San Francisco, California that developed and marketed cancer treatment medications. It was founded and incorporated with the California Secretary of State in February 1992 by venture capitalist Kevin J. Kinsella and Frank McCormick, Ph.D., FRS, D.Sc. (Hon.), a renowned British-American biochemist. McCormick served as the chief scientific officer until 1996, while Kinsella chaired the company's board of directors. On March 26, 1996, Onyx withdrew its corporate registration with the California Secretary of State and reincorporated in the state of Delaware in advance of successfully taking the company public on the NASDAQ exchange using National Market symbol ONXX on May 9, 1996. In 2009, the company acquired private biotechnology company Proteolix for US$276 million in cash plus additional milestone payments. In January 2012, the company was named "the top biotechnology takeover target in 2012" in an industry survey conducted by the ISI Group. Onyx president and CEO N. Anthony Coles had said that Onyx liked its prospects as an independent company and was focused on bringing new therapies to patients. However, by the end of August 2013, Amgen announced that it was acquiring Onyx in an agreed US$10.4 billion deal.

== Formation ==
Initial funding for the formation of Onyx came from biotechnology firm Chiron Corporation (granted a 43% stake in the new company) and venture capital investors: Avalon Ventures, Institutional Venture Partners (IVP), J. H. Whitney & Company and Kleiner Perkins. McCormick had been working on cancer treatments at Chiron before he was selected as vice president of research at the newly formed company, leading the company's research program. The acting president of the firm at its inception was Samuel D. Colella, a partner at early investor, IVP.

== Products and development ==
=== Nexavar ===
Co-developed and co-marketed with Bayer, sorafenib—sold under the trade name Nexavar—is a drug approved in the United States for the treatment of advanced renal cell carcinoma (kidney cancer) in 2005, and for the treatment of inoperable hepatocellular carcinoma, the most common form of liver cancer, in 2007. Sorafenib has also been evaluated in other types of cancer, including thyroid (as a treatment of last resort) and breast (in comparison to capecitabine).

In July 2014, the company announced the phase III failure of a Sorafenib-Capecitabine combination trial. The drug combination failed to increase progression free survival of patients with advanced breast cancer.

=== Kyprolis ===
Carfilzomib, marketed under the trade name Kyprolis, was approved on June 20, 2012, by the FDA for use in patients with multiple myeloma who have received at least two prior therapies, including treatment with bortezomib and an immunotherapy, and have demonstrated disease progression on or within 60 days of completion of the most recent therapy. Carfilzomib is also being evaluated in other stages of multiple myeloma. The most commonly reported adverse reactions (incidence ≥ 30%) are fatigue, anemia, nausea, thrombocytopenia, shortness of breath, diarrhea and fever.

=== Stivarga ===
Regorafenib (marketed under the trade name Stivarga) is currently being studied as a potential treatment option in multiple tumor types. On September 27, 2012, the FDA approved regorafenib for the treatment of patients with metastatic colorectal cancer who have been previously treated with fluoropyrimidine-, oxaliplatin- and irinotecan-based chemotherapy, an anti-VEGF therapy, and, if KRAS wild-type, an anti-EGFR therapy. On February 25, 2013, the FDA approved regorafenib in a second indication to treat patients with locally advanced, unresectable or metastatic gastrointestinal stromal tumor (GIST) who have been previously treated with imatinib mesylate and sunitinib malate. Regorafenib is a compound developed by Bayer. The most common adverse reactions (≥ 20%) are asthenia/fatigue, hand-foot skin reaction (HFSR), diarrhea, decreased appetite/food intake, hypertension, mucositis, dysphonia and infection, pain (not otherwise specified), weight loss, abdominal pain, rash, fever and nausea. In 2011, Bayer entered into an agreement with Onyx under which Onyx will receive a 20 percent royalty on any future global net sales of regorafenib in oncology. Bayer and Onyx jointly promote Stivarga in the United States.

== Acquisition ==
In June 2013, Amgen offered to buy the shares of Onyx Pharmaceuticals for US$120 per share, sending the shares up by around 30% after the news was announced. Onyx announced on June 30, 2013, that it had rejected the unsolicited proffer from Amgen and its board of directors had subsequently authorized their financial advisers to contact other potential acquisition suitors. However after a series of efforts to secure a higher per-share price from other potential buyers repeatedly failed to materialize, the board reversed course and agreed to Amgen's original terms; the acquisition was formally announced on August 25, 2013.
