= Indisulam =

Names
- Preferred IUPAC name N^{1}-(3-Chloro-1H-indol-7-yl)benzene-1,4-disulfonamide
- Other names E7070

Identifiers
CAS Number	165668-41-7
3D model (JSmol)	Interactive image
ChEBI	CHEBI:145431
ChEMBL	ChEMBL77517
ChemSpider	187608
DrugBank	DB06370
KEGG	D04522
PubChem CID	216468
UNII	WJ98J3NM90
CompTox Dashboard (EPA)	DTXSID50168008
- InChI: InChI=1S/C14H12ClN3O4S2/c15-12-8-17-14-11(12)2-1-3-13(14)18-24(21,22)10-6-4-9(5-7-10)23(16,19)20/h1-8,17-18H,(H2,16,19,20) Key: SETFNECMODOHTO-UHFFFAOYSA-N
- SMILES: C1=CC2=C(C(=C1)NS(=O)(=O)C3=CC=C(C=C3)S(=O)(=O)N)NC=C2Cl

Properties
Chemical formula	C_{14}H_{12}ClN_{3}O_{4}S_{2}
Molar mass	385.84 g·mol^{−1}
- Except where otherwise noted, data are given for materials in their standard state (at 25 °C [77 °F], 100 kPa). Infobox references

Indisulam is a chloroindolyl sulfonamide cell cycle inhibitor that exhibits antitumor activity in vitro and in an animal model. This compound affects cell cycle progression in human tumor cells and is being studied for the treatment of cancers such as melanomas and blood-borne cancers such as leukemia.
