= Epoxomicin =

Names
- IUPAC name (2S,3S)-N-((2S,3R)-3-hydroxy-1-(((S)-4-methyl-1-((R)-2-methyloxiran-2-yl)-1-oxopentan-2-yl)amino)-1-oxobutan-2-yl)-3-methyl-2-((2S,3S)-3-methyl-2-(N-methylacetamido)pentanamido)pentanamide
- Other names BU 4061T

Identifiers
CAS Number	134381-21-8
3D model (JSmol)	Interactive image
ChEMBL	ChEMBL207990
ChemSpider	9401737
PubChem CID	16760412
UNII	Y0900I3U8U
CompTox Dashboard (EPA)	DTXSID5044073
- InChI: InChI=1S/C28H50N4O7/c1-11-16(5)21(30-27(38)23(17(6)12-2)32(10)19(8)34)25(36)31-22(18(7)33)26(37)29-20(13-15(3)4)24(35)28(9)14-39-28/h15-18,20-23,33H,11-14H2,1-10H3,(H,29,37)(H,30,38)(H,31,36)/t16-,17-,18+,20?,21?,22?,23?,28+/m0/s1 Key: DOGIDQKFVLKMLQ-BPHQUOOUSA-N
- SMILES: O=C([C@@]1(C)CO1)[C@H](CC(C)C)NC([C@@H](NC([C@H]([C@@H](C)CC)NC([C@H]([C@@H](C)CC)N(C)C(C)=O)=O)=O)[C@H](O)C)=O

Properties
Chemical formula	C_{28}H_{50}N_{4}O_{7}
Molar mass	554.729 g·mol^{−1}
Appearance	White solid
Solubility in DMSO	10 mg/mL
- Except where otherwise noted, data are given for materials in their standard state (at 25 °C [77 °F], 100 kPa). verify (what is ?) Infobox references

Epoxomicin is a naturally occurring selective proteasome inhibitor with anti-inflammatory activity. It was originally discovered in 1992. Injected, it can induce Parkinson's-like symptoms in rats.

Derivatives of epoxomicin include carfilzomib.
