= Avadomide =

Chemical compound

Legal status
- Legal status: Investigational

Identifiers
- IUPAC name: 3-(5-Amino-2-methyl-4-oxoquinazolin-3-yl)piperidine-2,6-dione
- CAS Number: 1015474-32-4
- PubChem CID: 24967599
- IUPHAR/BPS: 10522
- DrugBank: DB14857
- ChemSpider: 35521266
- UNII: 28DZS29F59
- KEGG: D11132
- ChEMBL: ChEMBL3989934

Chemical and physical data
- Formula: C_{14}H_{14}N_{4}O_{3}
- Molar mass: 286.291 g·mol^{−1}
- 3D model (JSmol): Interactive image
- SMILES: Cc1nc2cccc(N)c2c(=O)n1C1CCC(=O)NC1=O
- InChI: InChI=1S/C14H14N4O3/c1-7-16-9-4-2-3-8(15)12(9)14(21)18(7)10-5-6-11(19)17-13(10)20/h2-4,10H,5-6,15H2,1H3,(H,17,19,20); Key:RSNPAKAFCAAMBH-UHFFFAOYSA-N

Avadomide (CC-122) is an experimental cereblon E3 ligase modulator, or thalidomide analog (molecular glue) that was discovered and studied by Celgene to see if it was effective against cancer. The deuterated S-enantiomer, SP-3164 (DRX-164) is in development at Salarius Pharmaceuticals.
