= Luxdegalutamide =

Chemical compound

Clinical data
- Other names: ARV-766, JSB462
- Routes of administration: Oral

Legal status
- Legal status: Investigational

Identifiers
- IUPAC name: (8^{3}S)-N-[(1r,3S)-3-(4-cyano-3-methoxyphenoxy)-2,2,4,4-tetramethylcyclobutyl]-5^{3}-fluoro-6,8^{2},8^{6}-trioxo-7-aza-4(1,4)-piperazina-2(1,4),8(3)-dipiperidina- 1(1),5(1,4)-dibenzenaoctaphane-1^{4}-carboxamide
- CAS Number: 2750830-09-0
- PubChem CID: 156504141
- ChemSpider: 128921978
- UNII: 5BD7R933PV
- KEGG: D13059
- ChEMBL: ChEMBL5314528

Chemical and physical data
- Formula: C_{45}H_{54}FN_{7}O_{6}
- Molar mass: 807.968 g·mol^{−1}
- 3D model (JSmol): Interactive image
- SMILES: CC1(C(C(C1OC2=CC(=C(C=C2)C#N)OC)(C)C)NC(=O)C3=CC=C(C=C3)N4CCC(CC4)CN5CCN(CC5)C6=CC(=C(C=C6)C(=O)N[C@H]7CCC(=O)NC7=O)F)C
- InChI: InChI=1S/C45H54FN7O6/c1-44(2)42(45(3,4)43(44)59-33-12-8-30(26-47)37(25-33)58-5)50-39(55)29-6-9-31(10-7-29)52-18-16-28(17-19-52)27-51-20-22-53(23-21-51)32-11-13-34(35(46)24-32)40(56)48-36-14-15-38(54)49-41(36)57/h6-13,24-25,28,36,42-43H,14-23,27H2,1-5H3,(H,48,56)(H,50,55)(H,49,54,57)/t36-,42?,43?/m0/s1; Key:RDPPBRKNBBXPNZ-PJXMSJPKSA-N

Luxdegalutamide, also known as ARV-766, is an investigational oral androgen receptor (AR) degrader being developed by Arvinas for the treatment of metastatic castration-resistant prostate cancer (mCRPC). It belongs to a class of drugs called proteolysis targeting chimeras (PROTACs), which are designed to selectively degrade specific proteins by hijacking the ubiquitin-proteasome system. Luxdegalutamide is a second-generation PROTAC AR degrader that has demonstrated a broader efficacy profile and better tolerability compared to its predecessor, ARV-110, in clinical settings. It has shown promise in overcoming resistance associated with certain AR mutations, including the L702H mutation, which is prevalent in up to 24% of treated mCRPC patients. As of 2024, luxdegalutamide is being evaluated in phase I/II clinical trials for prostate cancer.
