= Bavdegalutamide =

Chemical compound

Clinical data
- Other names: ARV-110

Identifiers
- IUPAC name: N-[4-(3-chloro-4-cyanophenoxy)cyclohexyl]-6-[4-[[4-[2-(2,6-dioxopiperidin-3-yl)-6-fluoro-1,3-dioxoisoindol-5-yl]piperazin-1-yl]methyl]piperidin-1-yl]pyridazine-3-carboxamide
- CAS Number: 2222112-77-6
- PubChem CID: 134414307
- DrugBank: DB19032
- ChemSpider: 110415899
- UNII: H6NYM0V650
- KEGG: D12316
- ChEMBL: ChEMBL4862963

Chemical and physical data
- Formula: C_{41}H_{43}ClFN_{9}O_{6}
- Molar mass: 812.30 g·mol^{−1}
- 3D model (JSmol): Interactive image
- SMILES: C1CC(CCC1NC(=O)C2=NN=C(C=C2)N3CCC(CC3)CN4CCN(CC4)C5=C(C=C6C(=C5)C(=O)N(C6=O)C7CCC(=O)NC7=O)F)OC8=CC(=C(C=C8)C#N)Cl
- InChI: InChI=1S/C41H43ClFN9O6/c42-31-19-28(4-1-25(31)22-44)58-27-5-2-26(3-6-27)45-38(54)33-7-9-36(48-47-33)51-13-11-24(12-14-51)23-49-15-17-50(18-16-49)35-21-30-29(20-32(35)43)40(56)52(41(30)57)34-8-10-37(53)46-39(34)55/h1,4,7,9,19-21,24,26-27,34H,2-3,5-6,8,10-18,23H2,(H,45,54)(H,46,53,55); Key:CLCTZVRHDOAUGJ-UHFFFAOYSA-N

Bavdegalutamide is an experimental proteolysis targeting chimera that functions as a androgen receptor degrader. It is being developed to treat metastatic castration-resistant prostate cancer.
