= Vepdegestrant =

Chemical compound

Clinical data
- Pronunciation: /ˌvɛpdəˈdʒɛstrənt/ VEP-də-JES-trənt
- Trade names: Veppanu
- Other names: ARV-471
- AHFS/Drugs.com: Monograph
- MedlinePlus: a626067
- License data: US DailyMed: Vepdegestrant
- Routes of administration: By mouth
- Drug class: Estrogen receptor antagonist
- ATC code: None

Legal status
- Legal status: US: ℞-only

Identifiers
- IUPAC name: (3S)-3-[6-[4-[[1-[4-[(1R,2S)-6-Hydroxy-2-phenyl-1,2,3,4-tetrahydronaphthalen-1-yl]phenyl]piperidin-4-yl]methyl]piperazin-1-yl]-3-oxo-1H-isoindol-2-yl]piperidine-2,6-dione
- CAS Number: 2229711-68-4
- PubChem CID: 134562533
- DrugBank: DB19006
- ChemSpider: 114935295
- UNII: WC1U3R1YMI
- KEGG: D12628
- ChEBI: CHEBI:747473
- ChEMBL: ChEMBL5095210

Chemical and physical data
- Formula: C_{45}H_{49}N_{5}O_{4}
- Molar mass: 723.918 g·mol^{−1}
- 3D model (JSmol): Interactive image
- SMILES: C1CC2=C(C=CC(=C2)O)[C@H]([C@H]1C3=CC=CC=C3)C4=CC=C(C=C4)N5CCC(CC5)CN6CCN(CC6)C7=CC8=C(C=C7)C(=O)N(C8)[C@H]9CCC(=O)NC9=O
- InChI: InChI=1S/C45H49N5O4/c51-37-12-15-39-33(27-37)8-13-38(31-4-2-1-3-5-31)43(39)32-6-9-35(10-7-32)48-20-18-30(19-21-48)28-47-22-24-49(25-23-47)36-11-14-40-34(26-36)29-50(45(40)54)41-16-17-42(52)46-44(41)53/h1-7,9-12,14-15,26-27,30,38,41,43,51H,8,13,16-25,28-29H2,(H,46,52,53)/t38-,41+,43+/m1/s1; Key:TZZDVPMABRWKIZ-XMOGEVODSA-N

Vepdegestrant, sold under the brand name Veppanu, is an anti-cancer medication used for the treatment of breast cancer. It is a heterobifunctional protein degrader. It was developed by Arvinas and Pfizer. It is taken by mouth.

Vepdegestrant was approved for medical use in the United States in May 2026.

== Medical uses ==
Veppanu is indicated for the treatment of adults with estrogen receptor (ER)-positive, human epidermal growth factor receptor 2 (HER2)-negative, estrogen receptor-1 (ESR1)-mutated advanced or metastatic breast cancer, as detected by an FDA-authorized test, with disease progression following at least one line of endocrine therapy.

== Adverse effects ==
The US prescribing information includes warnings and precautions for QTc interval prolongation and embryo-fetal toxicity.

== Mechanism of action ==
Vepdegestrant is designed as a PROTAC that recruits the ubiquitin-proteasome system to target the estrogen receptor for degradation. The compound contains both an E3 ubiquitin ligase-binding moiety and an estrogen receptor-binding domain, intended to bring these proteins into proximity to trigger ubiquitination and subsequent proteasomal degradation of the ER protein. In laboratory studies, vepdegestrant demonstrated ER degradation in ER-positive breast cancer cell lines with reported DC50 values of approximately 1-2 nM.

== History ==
Efficacy was evaluated in VERITAC-2 (NCT05654623), a randomized, open-label, active-controlled, multi-center trial in 624 adults with ER-positive, HER2-negative, advanced or metastatic breast cancer, of whom 270 had tumors carrying ESR1 mutations. Participants were required to have disease progression on one to two lines of endocrine therapy, including one line with a CDK4/6 inhibitor. Participants were randomized (1:1) to receive vepdegestrant orally once daily, or fulvestrant intramuscularly on days 1 and 15 of cycle 1 and then once monthly thereafter. Randomization was stratified by ESR1 mutation status and visceral metastasis. ESR1 mutational status was determined by blood circulating tumor deoxyribonucleic acid (ctDNA) using central or local testing.

=== Phase I/II trials ===
Vepdegestrant has been evaluated in early-phase clinical trials as both monotherapy and in combination with other agents in participants with ER+/HER2- breast cancer. In a first-in-human Phase I/II study, vepdegestrant monotherapy was well tolerated and showed clinical activity in pretreated participants.

=== Phase III VERITAC-2 trial ===
The Phase III VERITAC-2 trial (NCT05654623) is a randomized, open-label study comparing vepdegestrant to fulvestrant in participants with ER+/HER2- advanced breast cancer. The trial enrolled 624 participants at sites in 26 countries who had previously received treatment with a CDK4/6 inhibitor plus endocrine therapy.

In March 2025, results were announced from the VERITAC-2 trial. According to company statements, the study met its primary endpoint in the ESR1-mutant patient population, showing improvement in progression-free survival compared to fulvestrant. However, the trial did not achieve statistical significance in the overall intent-to-treat population. Detailed results were presented at the 2025 American Society of Clinical Oncology (ASCO) Annual Meeting.

In the Phase III VERITAC-2 trial, vepdegestrant demonstrated a 43% reduction in the risk of disease progression or death versus fulvestrant in the ESR1-mutant subgroup. It extended median progression-free survival to 5.0 months from 2.1 months.

=== Preclinical studies ===
In preclinical studies, vepdegestrant achieved greater ER degradation in vivo compared with fulvestrant, which correlated with improved tumor growth inhibition (TGI). The compound showed high efficacy as monotherapy and demonstrated synergistic effects when combined with CDK4/6 inhibitors or PI3K/mTOR pathway inhibitors in preclinical ER+ breast cancer models.

== Society and culture ==
=== Legal status ===
The US Food and Drug Administration (FDA) granted fast track designation to vepdegestrant in February 2024, as a monotherapy for the treatment of adults with ER+/HER2- metastatic breast cancer.

Vepdegestrant was approved for medical use in the United States in May 2026.

=== Names ===
Vepdegestrant is the international nonproprietary name.

Vepdegestrant is sold under the brand name Veppanu.
