= IKZF3 =

Protein-coding gene in the species Homo sapiens

Identifiers
- Aliases: IKZF3, AIO, AIOLOS, ZNFN1A3, IKAROS family zinc finger 3, IMD84
- External IDs: OMIM: 606221; MGI: 1342542; GeneCards: IKZF3

Gene location (Human)
Chr.	Chromosome 17 (human)
Band	17q12-q21.1	Start	39,757,718 bp
Band	17q12-q21.1	End	39,864,312 bp

Gene location (Mouse)
Chr.	Chromosome 11 (mouse)
Band	11|11 D	Start	98,355,728 bp
Band	11|11 D	End	98,436,857 bp
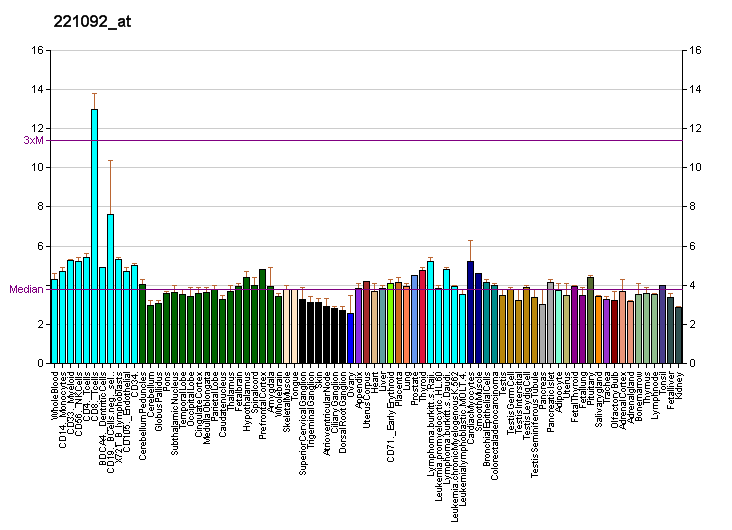
RNA expression pattern
Bgee	Human / Mouse (ortholog); Top expressed in: granulocyte; lymph node; epithelium of nasopharynx; bone marrow cell; thymus; spleen; blood; tonsil; superficial temporal artery; appendix / Top expressed in: mesenteric lymph nodes; thymus; spleen; blood; lumbar subsegment of spinal cord; female urethra; subcutaneous adipose tissue; submandibular gland; granulocyte; transitional epithelium of urinary bladder; More reference expression data
BioGPS	More reference expression data
Gene ontology
Molecular function	sequence-specific DNA binding; DNA binding; RNA polymerase II transcription regulatory region sequence-specific DNA binding; protein homodimerization activity; DNA-binding transcription factor activity; DNA-binding transcription activator activity, RNA polymerase II-specific; metal ion binding; protein binding; protein heterodimerization activity; nucleic acid binding; identical protein binding; DNA-binding transcription factor activity, RNA polymerase II-specific
Cellular component	cytoplasm; plasma membrane; nucleus; nucleoplasm; cytosol
Biological process	regulation of apoptotic process; regulation of transcription, DNA-templated; regulation of transcription by RNA polymerase II; transcription by RNA polymerase II; transcription, DNA-templated; B cell activation; regulation of B cell proliferation; regulation of lymphocyte differentiation; mesoderm development; regulation of B cell differentiation; positive regulation of transcription by RNA polymerase II; response to bacterium
Sources:Amigo / QuickGO
Orthologs
Databases	NCBI: entry; OMA: entry
Species	Human	Mouse
Entrez	22806	22780
Ensembl	ENSG00000161405	ENSMUSG00000018168
UniProt	Q9UKT9	O08900
RefSeq (mRNA)	NM_183232; NM_001257408; NM_001257409; NM_001257410; NM_001257411 NM_001257412; NM_001257413; NM_001257414; NM_001284514; NM_001284515; NM_001284516; NM_012481; NM_183228; NM_183229; NM_183230; NM_183231	NM_011771
RefSeq (protein)	NP_001244337; NP_001244338; NP_001244339; NP_001244340; NP_001244341 NP_001244342; NP_001244343; NP_001271443; NP_001271444; NP_001271445; NP_036613; NP_899051; NP_899052; NP_899053; NP_899054; NP_899055	NP_035901
Location (UCSC)	Chr 17: 39.76 – 39.86 Mb	Chr 11: 98.36 – 98.44 Mb
PubMed search
- Wikidata
View/Edit Human	View/Edit Mouse

Zinc finger protein Aiolos, also known as Ikaros family zinc finger protein 3, is a protein encoded in humans by the IKZF3 gene.

== Function ==
This gene encodes a member of the Ikaros family of zinc-finger proteins. Three members of this protein family (Ikaros, Aiolos and Helios) are hematopoietic-specific transcription factors involved in the regulation of lymphocyte development. This gene product is a transcription factor that is important in the regulation of B lymphocyte proliferation and differentiation. Both Ikaros and Aiolos can participate in chromatin remodeling. The regulation of gene expression in B lymphocytes by Aiolos is complex as it appears to require the sequential formation of Ikaros homodimers, Ikaros/Aiolos heterodimers, and Aiolos homodimers. At least six alternative transcripts encoding different isoforms have been described.

== Interactions ==
IKZF3 has been shown to interact with BCL2-like 1 and HRAS.
