= Proteolysis targeting chimera =

Small molecule (PROTAC)

TL 12-186, a thalidomide-based PROTAC targeting the protein GSPT1, a translation termination factor

A proteolysis targeting chimera (PROTAC) is a molecule that can remove specific unwanted proteins. Rather than acting as a conventional enzyme inhibitor, a PROTAC works by inducing selective intracellular proteolysis. A heterobifunctional molecule with two active domains and a linker, PROTACs consist of two covalently linked protein-binding molecules: one capable of engaging an E3 ubiquitin ligase, and another that binds to a target protein. Recruitment of the E3 ligase to the target results in ubiquitination and subsequent degradation of the target protein via the proteasome. Because PROTACs need only to bind their targets with high selectivity (rather than inhibit the target protein's enzymatic activity), efforts are underway to retool previously ineffective inhibitor molecules as PROTACs.

== Mechanism of action ==
Mechanism. E1, E2, E3: ubiquitination enzymes; Ub = ubiquitin; target = protein to be degraded

PROTACs achieve degradation through "hijacking" the cell's ubiquitin–proteasome system (UPS) by bringing together the target protein and an E3 ligase.

First, the E1 activates and conjugates the ubiquitin to the E2. The E2 then forms a complex with the E3 ligase. The E3 ligase targets proteins and covalently attaches the ubiquitin to the protein of interest. Eventually, after a ubiquitin chain is formed, the protein is recognized and degraded by the 26S proteasome. PROTACs take advantage of this cellular system by putting the protein of interest in close proximity to the E3 ligase to catalyze degradation.

Unlike traditional inhibitors, PROTACs have a catalytic mechanism, with the PROTAC itself being recycled after the target protein is degraded.

== Design and development ==
The protein targeting warhead, E3 ligase, and linker must all be considered for PROTAC development. Formation of a ternary complex between the protein of interest, PROTAC, and E3 ligase may be evaluated to characterize PROTAC activity because it often leads to ubiquitination and subsequent degradation of the targeted protein. A hook effect is commonly observed with high concentrations of PROTACs due to the bifunctional nature of the degrader. This concentration-dependent saturation results in independent binary complexes that compete with and prevent effective ternary complex assembly, presenting a notable hurdle in clinical dosing optimization.

Currently, pVHL and CRBN have been used in preclinical trials as E3 ligases. However, there still remains hundreds of E3 ligases to be explored, with some giving the opportunity for cell specificity.

Additionally, there have been attempts to produce PROTACs which target bacteria (BacPROTAC) as a way of circumventing antibiotic resistance. These BacPROTACs target the ClpC:ClpP protease system, an analogue with similar function to E3 ubiquitin ligase in bacterial cells.

== Benefits ==
Compared to traditional inhibitors, PROTACs display multiple benefits that make them desirable drug candidates. Due to their catalytic mechanism, PROTACs can be administered at lower doses compared to their inhibitor analogues, though care needs to be taken in achieving oral bioavailability if administered by that route. Some PROTACs have been shown to be more selective than their inhibitor analogues, reducing off-target effects. PROTACs have the ability to target previously undruggable proteins, as they do not need to target catalytic pockets. This includes proteins such as transcription factors and RNA binding proteins. This also helps prevent mutation-driven drug resistance often found with enzymatic inhibitors.

== History ==
Kathleen Sakamoto, Craig Crews and Ray Deshaies initially described PROTACs in 2001. PROTAC technology has been applied by drug discovery labs using various E3 ligases, including pVHL, CRBN, Mdm2, beta-TrCP1, DCAF11, DCAF15, DCAF16, RNF114, and c-IAP1. Yale University licensed the PROTAC technology to Arvinas in 2013–14.

In 2019, Arvinas put two PROTACs into clinical trials: bavdegalutamide (ARV-110), an androgen receptor degrader, and vepdegestrant (ARV-471), an estrogen receptor degrader. In 2021, Arvinas put a second androgen receptor PROTAC, Luxdegalutamide (ARV-766), into the clinic.

In 2026, vepdegestrant, marketed as Veppanu, became the first PROTAC approved by the Food and Drug Administration. The drug, developed by Arvinas and Pfizer, is an estrogen receptor degrader approved for a subset of patients with advanced or metastatic estrogen receptor-positive, HER2-negative breast cancer with ESR1 mutations. The approval was based on the VERITAC-2 trial, in which vepdegestrant improved median progression-free survival compared with fulvestrant in patients with ESR1 mutations.

== PROTAC databases ==
- BioGRID is an open public resource containing manually curated molecular interaction data. In addition to its extensive catalogue of genetic and protein interactions, BioGRID also curates chemical interactions including experimentally-determined PROTACs and PROTAC-related molecules with accompanying target and E3 information.
- PROTACpedia, a manually curated and user-contributed PROTAC-specific public access database.
- E3 Atlas, a comprehensive E3 database that characterizes the potential for specific E3 ligases to be employed for PROTAC design.
- PROTAC-DB, a web-based open-access database that integrates structural information and experimental data of PROTACs.

== PROTAC tools ==
- PROTAC-Splitter, a machine learning–based framework for the automated identification and decomposition of PROTAC substructures into ligand, linker, and E3 ligase components.
- Bellerophon, a rule-based tool that automatically decomposes PROTACs into their warhead, linker, and E3 ligase ligand directly from molecular structure.
