= Sphingosine-1-phosphate receptor modulator =

Drug class

- Drug class
- Sphingosine-1-phosphate

Class identifiers
- Use: Multiple Sclerosis (MS), psoriasis, Host vs. graft disease, organ transplant
- ATC code: L04AA
- Biological target: Sphingosine-1-phosphate receptor

Legal status

Sphingosine-1-phosphate receptor modulators are a class of drugs that interact with S1P receptors, a family of G protein-coupled receptors involved in various physiological processes, particularly in the immune and nervous systems. These modulators have gained significant attention due to their ability to alter lymphocyte trafficking and potentially provide therapeutic benefits in autoimmune diseases, particularly multiple sclerosis (MS). The most well-known compound in this class is fingolimod (FTY720), which was the first oral disease-modifying therapy approved for the treatment of relapsing-remitting MS.

These drugs have the ability to modulate the G-protein coupled S1P receptors. Drugs that modulate S1P1 receptors bind to those receptors in lymph nodes and prevent certain lymphoid immune cells from being excreted into the blood and reaching the central nervous system (CNS), leading to lymphopenia.

== History and development ==
=== Discovery ===
The class of drugs known as S1P receptor modulators came into being with the synthesis of compound FTY720 (fingolimod) in 1992. The drug was developed following observations of immunosuppressive action in ISP-1 (myriocin), a natural product derived from the fungus Isaria sinclairii. Myriocin, see illustration 1, is an untraditional amino acid that has showed effectiveness as an in vivo immunosuppressant in rats. This led to further investigation of a possible drug-class that could be used in immunosuppressive therapy. The lymphopenia causing mechanism of fingolimod was discovered in 2002 and was found to be due to the drug's ability to alter the S1P1 receptor in the secondary lymphs. Furthermore, fingolimod was found to modulate receptors 1-5 of the sphingosine-1-phosphate class. Fingolimod is the first-in-class discovered drug that act as a sphingosine-1-receptor modulator. Even though it has the drawback of not being a selective receptor modulator it has passed all clinical drug trials and was approved for the market in USA in 2010. In the beginning the focus of developing a drug from myriocin was to find an immunosuppressant drug that could be used to prevent rejection of organs during and after a transplant. But fingolimod was later found to be more effective against multiple sclerosis. The mechanism that lead to the desired effect of fingolimod is due to the modulation of S1P1 receptors and the future development of this drug class is therefore aiming for more selective modulators than fingolimod.

=== Development ===
Researchers figured out that the metabolite ISP-1, myriocin, was 10 times more active than cyclosporin A. The first drug FTY720 (fingolimod) was developed from ISP-1. Because the metabolite itself is an amphiphilic compound and, which represent poor cellular permeability and oral bioavailability FTY720, fingolimod, was synthesized to improve these properties in vivo.

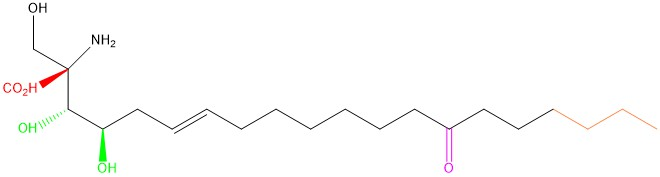
Illustration 1: The parent compound ISP-1 (myriocin). The coloured groups represent the structural changes that were made to the compound to synthesize fingolimod.

To enhance its activity a few changes were made to the structure shown in illustration 1. In order to find an active pharmacophore the structure was simplified by removing chirality and functionality. The first chiral group, marked red on illustration 1, was removed by the conversion of the carboxyl acid to 2-amino-1,2-propane diol.

As research continued it was discovered that reduction of the ketone and olefin groups, marked purple on illustration 1, was tolerated. Furthermore, the remaining 3-hydroxyl and 4-hydroxyl groups marked green on illustration 1 were non-essential to its activity. They were therefore removed from the compound resulting in an achiral intermediate and daughter compound. These changes of ISP-1 resulted in continued improvements in the profile of the compound.

To further improve the activity and safety the side chain was shortened from 28 carbons to 14 carbons marked orange on illustration 1.

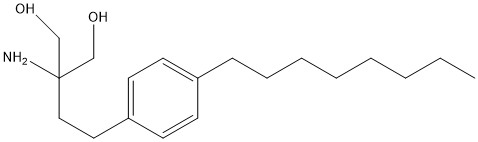
Illustration 2: The product FTY720 (fingolimod) is derived from ISP-1

To find the lead optimization a part of the fatty acid side chain was replaced with 1,4-disubstituted phenyl ring. This was done to decrease the bond rotation. The phenyl ring was moved along the side chain to find its optimal position. These efforts resulted in the two carbon linkers from the polar head group to the phenyl moiety. The resulting product was FTY720 as shown in illustration 2 and its activated, phosphorylated form in illustrations 3a and 3b. Research showed that FTY720 had the same efficacy as ISP-1 in vitro. Moreover, it was found that FTY720 is 100 times more efficient than Cyclosporin A against experimental autoimmune encephalomyelitis (EAE) in an animal model of multiple sclerosis.

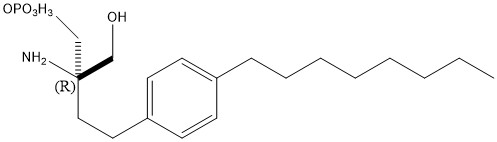
Illustration 3a: (R)-phosphorylated fingolimod

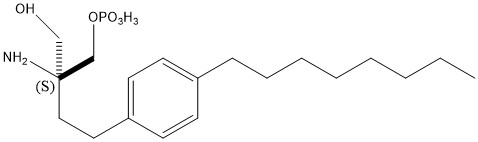
Illustration 3b: (S)-phosphorylated fingolimod

== Pharmacology ==
At first the mechanism of action of the first drug in this class (fingolimod) was unknown and great efforts were made to figure out its mechanism of action. Researchers figured out at last that these drugs are prodrugs and becomes active when being phosphorylated by kinases. Then the phosphorylated drug binds to sphingosine receptors: not only S1P1, but also S1P3, S1P4 and S1P5. By binding to the S1P receptors, the receptors break down with time and become inactivated. The myelin sheath is therefore less likely to break down and stays intact for a longer time.

The binding to receptor S1P1 is the one that contributes to the mechanism of action, while the others are thought to produce the unwanted side effects of the drugs. The aim in the future for these drugs is therefore to find chemicals/drugs that can bind more selectively to the S1P1 subtype.

Adverse side effect of the drugs at first dose can be bradycardia, influenza, back pain, hypertension, headache, cough, dyspnea and diarrhea. With further development of the class of drugs hopefully these side effects will no longer be a big issue.

== Clinical use ==
The first S1P receptor modulator available on the market was fingolimod. Fingolimod was approved and released on the market in USA in 2010 as an anti-multiple sclerosis drug.

Multiple sclerosis is an autoimmune disease where immune cells attack the neurons of the central nervous system and degrade the myelin that protect them.

There is no cure for multiple sclerosis, but disease modifying therapies (DMTs) can slow disease progression and reduce the frequency and severity of relapses. Whereas S1P receptor modulators work by modulating the immune system, other DMTs have different mechanisms, such as suppressing the immune system.

Other possible uses of S1P receptor modulators are as agents against autoimmunity, against cancer and inflammatory diseases like Alzheimer's disease, and in organ transplants to prevent rejection of the transplant.

== Sphingosine-1-receptor modulators drugs ==
Drugs	Indication	Receptor selectivity	Status
Fingolimod	Multiple sclerosis (MS)	S1P1, S1P3, S1P4 and S1P5	FDA approved 2010, EMA approved 2011
Ozanimod	Multiple sclerosis (MS) and ulcerative colitits (UC)	S1P1 and S1P5	FDA approved 2020
Siponimod	Multiple sclerosis (MS)	S1P1 and S1P5	FDA Approved 2019, EMA approved 2020
Ponesimod	Multiple sclerosis (MS), psoriasis and graft vs. host disease	S1P1	FDA Approved 2021, In Phase III clinical trials and Phase II trials. (*)

(*)In phase III for psoriasis, in phase II for graft vs. host.

(**) Is on the market in Russia.

- Etrasimod: approved by FDA and marketed by Pfizer as Velsipity. Inhibits S1P1 selectively.
- Ceralifimod: Selective inhibitor of S1P1 and S1P5.
- Zectivimod: Selective inhibitor of S1P1.
- Cenerimod: Selective inhibitor of S1P1 and S1P5.
- Tamuzimod: Selective inhibitor of S1P1.
- Mocravimod
- Udifitimod
- Vibozilimod
