= List of Cordyceps species =

As of December 2024, the following 262 species were accepted in the genus Cordyceps:

== A ==
- Cordyceps adpropinquans (Ces.) Sacc. 1883
- Cordyceps aeruginosclerota Z.Q. Liang & A.Y. Liu 1997
- Cordyceps agriotidis Kawam. 1955
- Cordyceps alba Kobayasi & Shimizu 1982
- Cordyceps albella Massee 1899
- Cordyceps albida Berk. & M.A. Curtis ex Cooke 1884
- Cordyceps albocitrinus Koval 1974
- Cordyceps alboperitheciata Kobayasi & Shimizu 1982
- Cordyceps alpicola Kobayasi 1976
- Cordyceps amoene-rosea (Henn.) Kepler, B. Shrestha & Spatafora 2017
- Cordyceps ampullacea Kobayasi & Shimizu 1982 (Note: Belongs to Cordyceps sensu stricto per Sung et al. (2007) using morphology.)
- Cordyceps araneae Mongkols., Tasan., Noisrip., Himaman & Luangsa-ard 2020
- Cordyceps aspera Pat. 1893
- Cordyceps atewensis Samson, H.C. Evans & Hoekstra 1982
- Cordyceps atrobrunnea Penz. & Sacc. 1898
- Cordyceps atropuncta Koval 1961
- Cordyceps aurantiaca Lohwag 1937
- Cordyceps aurea Moureau 1949

== B ==
- Cordyceps barberi Giard 1894
- Cordyceps baumanniana Henn. 1897
- Cordyceps belizensis Mains 1940
- Cordyceps bicolor Pat. 1928
- Cordyceps bifusispora O.E. Erikss. 1982 (Note: Belongs to Cordyceps sensu stricto per Sung et al. (2007) using molecular phylogeny.)
- Cordyceps blackwelliae Mongkols., Noisrip., Thanakitp., Spatafora & Luangsa-ard 2018
- Cordyceps bokyoensis Kobayasi 1983
- Cordyceps bombi Rick ex Lloyd 1920
- Cordyceps brasiliensis Henn. 1897
- Cordyceps brevistroma Mongkols., Tasan., Thanakitp. & Luangsa-ard 2020
- Cordyceps brittlebankii McLennan & Cookson 1926
- Cordyceps brongniartii Shimazu 1989
- Cordyceps bullispora Hong Yu bis, Q.Y. Dong & Zhi Yuan Zhao 2022
- Cordyceps bulolensis Kobayasi 1976

== C ==
- Cordyceps caespitosa (Tul. & C. Tul.) Sacc. 1878
- Cordyceps caespitosofiliformis Henn. 1902
- Cordyceps callidii Quél. 1898
- Cordyceps caloceroides Berk. & M.A. Curtis 1869
- Cordyceps carnata Moureau 1949
- Cordyceps caroliniensis Berk. & Ravenel 1855
- Cordyceps cateniannulata (Z.Q. Liang) Kepler, B. Shrestha & Spatafora 2017
- Cordyceps cateniobliqua (Z.Q. Liang) Kepler, B. Shrestha & Spatafora 2017
- Cordyceps chaetoclavata H. Yu, Y.B. Wang, Y. Wang, Q. Fan & Zhu L. Yang 2020
- Cordyceps changbaiensis J.J. Hu, Bo Zhang & Y. Li 2021
- Cordyceps changchunensis J.J. Hu, Bo Zhang & Y. Li 2021
- Cordyceps changpaishanensis Kobayasi 1981
- Cordyceps chanhua Z.Z. Li, F.G. Luan, N.L. Hywel-Jones, C.R. Li & S.L. Zhang 2021
- Cordyceps chiangdaoensis Tasan., Thanakitp., Khons. & Luangsa-ard 2016
- Cordyceps chichibuensis Kobayasi & Shimizu 1980
- Cordyceps chishuiensis Z.Q. Liang & A.Y. Liu 2002
- Cordyceps chongqingensis Y.H. Yang, Shao X. Cai, Y.M. Zheng, X.M. Lu, X.Y. Xu & Y.M. Han 2008
- Cordyceps chualasae Koval & M.M. Nazarova 1970
- Cordyceps cinnabarina Petch 1933
- Cordyceps citrea Penz. & Sacc. 1898
- Cordyceps coccidiocapitata Kobayasi & Shimizu 1982
- Cordyceps coccinea Penz. & Sacc. 1898
- Cordyceps cocoonihabita H. Yu, Y.B. Wang, Y. Wang, Q. Fan & Zhu L. Yang 2020
- Cordyceps coleopterorum (Samson & H.C. Evans) Kepler, B. Shrestha & Spatafora 2017
- Cordyceps consumpta G. Cunn. 1921
- Cordyceps coronilla Höhn. 1909
- Cordyceps cotopaxiana Kobayasi 1981
- Cordyceps coxii Olliff 1895
- Cordyceps craigii Lloyd 1915
- Cordyceps cranstounii Olliff 1895
- Cordyceps cristata Möller 1901
- Cordyceps ctenocephala P. Syd. 1922
- Cordyceps cuncunae Palfner 2012
- Cordyceps cusu Pat. 1895
- Cordyceps cylindrica Petch 1937

== D ==
- Cordyceps deflectens Penz. & Sacc. 1898
- Cordyceps dennisii T. Ulvinen 1976
- Cordyceps dimeropoda P. Syd. 1922
- Cordyceps doassansii Pat. 1885
- Cordyceps doiana Kobayasi 1981

== E ==
- Cordyceps erotyli Petch 1937
- Cordyceps exasperata A.F. Vital 1956

== F ==
- Cordyceps farinosa (Holmsk.) Kepler, B. Shrestha & Spatafora 2017
- Cordyceps fasciculata Pat. 1899
- Cordyceps flavobrunnescens Henn. 1899
- Cordyceps fleischeri Penz. & Sacc. 1902
- Cordyceps formosana Kobayasi & Shimizu 1981
- Cordyceps fuliginosa Ces. 1861
- Cordyceps fumosorosea (Wize) Kepler, B. Shrestha & Spatafora 2017
- Cordyceps furcata McLennan & Cookson 1923

== G ==
- Cordyceps gemella Moureau 1961
- Cordyceps geotrupis Teng 1934
- Cordyceps grenadensis Mains 1954
- Cordyceps grylli Teng 1936
- Cordyceps gryllotalpae Lloyd 1920
- Cordyceps guizhouensis Zuo Y. Liu, Z.Q. Liang & A.Y. Liu 1997

== H ==
- Cordyceps hackmannii Rehm 1904
- Cordyceps hawkesii G.R. Gray 1858
- Cordyceps hehuanensis W.Y. Chuang & Ariyaw. 2024
- Cordyceps henleyae Massee 1894
- Cordyceps hepialidicola Kobayasi & Shimizu 1983
- Cordyceps herculea (Schwein.) Sacc. 1883
- Cordyceps herculea (Cooke) Mussat 1901
- Cordyceps hesleri Mains 1939
- Cordyceps hirotaniana Kobayasi 1983 Kobayasi 1983
- Cordyceps hokkaidoensis Kobayasi 1941
- Cordyceps hormospora Möller 1901
- Cordyceps huntii Giard 1895

== I ==
- Cordyceps ignota Marchion. 1945
- Cordyceps imagamiana Kobayasi & Shimizu 1983
- Cordyceps incarnata Möller 1901
- Cordyceps inconspicua Moureau 1962
- Cordyceps interrupta Höhn. 1909
- Cordyceps inthanonensis Mongkols., Tasan., Thanakitp. & Luangsa-ard 2020
- Cordyceps iriomoteana Kobayasi & Shimizu 1982
- Cordyceps isarioides M.A. Curtis 1895
- Cordyceps ithacensis Bałazy & Bujak. 1986

== J ==
- Cordyceps jakajanicola Luangsa-ard, Tasan., Noisrip. & Hywel-Jones 2019
- Cordyceps javanica Bally 1923
- Cordyceps javensis Henn. 1902
- Cordyceps jinyuetanensis J.J. Hu, Bo Zhang & Y. Li 2021
- Cordyceps joaquiensis Henn. 1904
- Cordyceps juruensis Henn. 1904

== K ==
- Cordyceps kintrischica (B.A. Borisov & Tarasov) Kepler, B. Shrestha & Spatafora 2017
- Cordyceps kirkii G. Cunn. 1922
- Cordyceps klenei Pat. 1908
- Cordyceps kobayasii Koval 1984
- Cordyceps koratensis (Hywel-Jones) Ariyaw., M. Stadler & Luangsa-ard 2024
- Cordyceps kuiburiensis Himaman, Mongkols., Noisrip. & Luangsa-ard 2019
- Cordyceps kurijimeaensis Negi, Koranga, Ranj. Singh & Z. Ahmed 2010
- Cordyceps kyushuensis Kawam. 1955 also spelled kyusyuënsis

== L ==
- Cordyceps lacroixii Har. & Pat. 1904
- Cordyceps langloisii Ellis & Everh. 1892
- Cordyceps lateritia Dingley 1953
- Cordyceps lepidopterorum Moureau 1962
- Cordyceps leucocephala Massee 1899
- Cordyceps lignicola Massee 1899
- Cordyceps lilacina Moureau 1949
- Cordyceps locastrae W.Y. Chuang & Ariyaw. 2024
- Cordyceps longdongensis A.Y. Liu & Z.Q. Liang 1997
- Cordyceps longiphialis Hong Yu bis, Q.Y. Dong & D.X. Tang 2022
- Cordyceps loushanensis Z.Q. Liang & A.Y. Liu 1997

== M ==
- Cordyceps macleodganensis Sapan K. Sharma 2016
- Cordyceps malleiformis W.Y. Chuang & Ariyaw. 2024
- Cordyceps manzhurica Koval 1961
- Cordyceps maolanensis Zuo Y. Liu & Z.Q. Liang 1997
- Cordyceps maolanoides Z.Q. Liang, A.Y. Liu & J.Z. Huang 2002
- Cordyceps memorabilis (Ces.) Ces. 1861
- Cordyceps mexicana L. López-Rodríguez, C. Burrola-Aguilar & R. Garibay-Orijel 2022
- Cordyceps michaelisii Henn. 1902
- Cordyceps militaris (L.) Fr. (1818)
- Cordyceps miniata Moureau 1961
- Cordyceps minuta Kobayasi 1963
- Cordyceps miquelii (Tul. & C. Tul.) Sacc. 1883
- Cordyceps miryensis Henn. 1904
- Cordyceps mitrata Pat. 1898
- Cordyceps montagnei Berk. & M.A. Curtis 1869
- Cordyceps morakotii Tasan., Thanakitp. & Luangsa-ard 2016
- Cordyceps muscae Henn. 1898
- Cordyceps myosuroides Henn. 1902
- Cordyceps myrmecogena Kobayasi & Shimizu 1978

== N ==
- Cordyceps nabanheensis Hong Yu bis & Q.Y. Dong 2022
- Cordyceps nakazawae Kawam. 1955
- Cordyceps nanatakiensis Kobayasi & Shimizu 1983
- Cordyceps necator Pat. & Har. 1912
- Cordyceps neogryllotalpae Kobayasi 1976
- Cordyceps neopruinosa Mongkols., Noisrip., Khons. & Luangsa-ard 2020
- Cordyceps neosuperficialis T.H. Li, Chun Y. Deng & B. Song 2008
- Cordyceps nidus T. Sanjuan, Chir.-Salom. & S. Restrepo 2017
- Cordyceps nikkoensis Kobayasi 1941
- Cordyceps ninchukispora (C.H. Su & H.H. Wang) G.H. Sung, J.M. Sung, Hywel-Jones & Spatafora 2007
- Cordyceps ningxiaensis T. Bau & J.Q. Yan 2014
- Cordyceps nirtolii Negi, Koranga, Ranj. Singh & Z. Ahmed 2010
- Cordyceps norvegica Johan-Olsen 1911
- Cordyceps novoguineensis Kobayasi & Shimizu 1976

== O ==
- Cordyceps obliqua Kobayasi 1941
- Cordyceps obliquiordinata Kobayasi & Shimizu 1982
- Cordyceps ochraceostromata Kobayasi & Shimizu 1980
- Cordyceps odyneri Quél. 1886
- Cordyceps ogurasanensis Kobayasi & Shimizu 1982
- Cordyceps olivacea Rick 1922
- Cordyceps olivaceovirescens Henn. 1900
- Cordyceps olivascens Mains 1947
- Cordyceps oncoperae P.J. Wright 1993
- Cordyceps ootakiensis Kobayasi & Shimizu 1983
- Cordyceps ootakiensis Kobayasi & Shimizu 1983
- Cordyceps ovoideoperitheciata Kobayasi & Shimizu 1982
- Cordyceps oxycephala Penz. & Sacc. 1898

== P ==
- Cordyceps pallidiolivacea Kobayasi & Shimizu 1982
- Cordyceps parvistroma Mongkols., Tasan., Thanakitp. & Luangsa-ard 2020
- Cordyceps parvula Mains 1959
- Cordyceps phymatospora C.R. Li, M.Z. Fan & Z.Z. Li 2002
- Cordyceps pieli Olliff 1895
- Cordyceps pilifera Kobayasi 1981
- Cordyceps pittieri E. Bommer & M. Rousseau 1896
- Cordyceps pleuricapitata Kobayasi & Shimizu 1982
- Cordyceps podocreoides Höhn. 1909
- Cordyceps policapitata X.C. Peng, Y.P. Xiao & T.C. Wen 2023
- Cordyceps polyarthra Möller 1901
- Cordyceps polycarpica Z.Q. Liang & A.Y. Liu 1996
- Cordyceps polycephala Kobayasi & Shimizu 1983
- Cordyceps polystromata Hong Yu bis, Y. Wang & Q.Y. Dong 2023
- Cordyceps poprawskii (Caban., J.H. de Leon, Humber, K.D. Murray & W.A. Jones) Kepler, B. Shrestha & Spatafora 2017
- Cordyceps pruinosa Petch 1924
- Cordyceps pseudoinsignis Moureau 1949
- Cordyceps pseudonelumboides Kobayasi & Shimizu 1982
- Cordyceps pseudorosea W.Y. Chuang & Ariyaw. 2024
- Cordyceps puiggarii Speg. 1918

== Q ==
- Cordyceps qingchengensis L.S. Zha & T.C. Wen 2019

== R ==
- Cordyceps racemosa Berk. 1854
- Cordyceps ramosostipitata Kobayasi & Shimizu 1983
- Cordyceps rhizomorpha Möller 1901
- Cordyceps riverae Pacioni 1979
- Cordyceps rosea Kobayasi & Shimizu 1982
- Cordyceps roseostromata Kobayasi & Shimizu 1983
- Cordyceps rostrata Z.Q. Liang, A.Y. Liu & M.H. Liu 2003
- Cordyceps rubiginosistipitata Kobayasi & Shimizu 1983
- Cordyceps rubra Möller 1901
- Cordyceps rubricapitata Kobayasi & Shimizu 1983
- Cordyceps rubrostromata Kobayasi 1983

== S ==
- Cordyceps sakishimensis Kobayasi & Shimizu 1983
- Cordyceps sandindaengensis Mongkols., Noisrip. & Luangsa-ard 2023
- Cordyceps sapaensis Hong Yu bis, Y. Wang & Q.Y. Dong 2023
- Cordyceps scottianus Olliff 1895
- Cordyceps setulosa Quél. 1875
- Cordyceps shanxiensis B. Liu, Rong & H.S. Jin 1985
- Cordyceps sheeringii Massee 1890
- Cordyceps shimaensis Kobayasi 1981
- Cordyceps shimizui Y.J. Yao 1995
- Cordyceps shuifuensis H. Yu, Y.B. Wang, Y. Wang & Zhu L. Yang 2020
- Cordyceps siangyangensis W.Y. Chuang & Ariyaw. 2024
- Cordyceps simaoensis Hong Yu bis, Q.Y. Dong & Z.Q. Wang 2022
- Cordyceps sinclairii Kobayasi 1949
- Cordyceps singeri Mains 1954
- Cordyceps spegazzinii M.S. Torres, J.F. White & J.F. Bisch. 2006
- Cordyceps sphaerocapitata Kobayasi 1976
- Cordyceps stiphrodes P. Syd. 1922
- Cordyceps subcorticicola Henn. 1902
- Cordyceps submilitaris Henn. 1896
- Cordyceps subpolyarthra Henn. 1902
- Cordyceps subtenuipes H. Yu, Y.B. Wang, Y. Wang, D.E. Duan & Zhu L. Yang 2020
- Cordyceps succavus Y.P. Xiao, T.C. Wen & K.D. Hyde 2019
- Cordyceps sulfurea Kobayasi & Shimizu 1983
- Cordyceps suoluoensis Z.Q. Liang & A.Y. Liu 2002

== T ==
- Cordyceps taishanensis B. Liu, P.G. Yuan & J.Z. Cao 1984
- Cordyceps takaomontana Yakush. & Kumaz. 1941
- Cordyceps tarapotensis Henn. 1904
- Cordyceps tenuipes (Peck) Kepler, B. Shrestha & Spatafora 2017
- Cordyceps termitophila Kobayasi & Shimizu 1978
- Cordyceps thaxteri Mains 1939
- Cordyceps tiankengensis W.H. Chen, Y.F. Han, J.D. Liang & Z.Q. Liang 2022
- Cordyceps translucens Petch 1924
- Cordyceps trictenae Olliff 1895
- Cordyceps trinidadensis Mains 1959
- Cordyceps truncata Moureau 1949
- Cordyceps typhuliformis Berk. & Cooke 1884

== U ==
- Cordyceps uleana Henn. 1904
- Cordyceps ussuriensis Koval 1961

== V ==
- Cordyceps variegata Moureau 1949
- Cordyceps velutipes Massee 1895
- Cordyceps venezuelensis Mains 1947
- Cordyceps vinosa Moureau 1961
- Cordyceps vorobjovii Koval & M.M. Nazarova 1970

== W ==
- Cordyceps wallaysii Westend. 1859
- Cordyceps washingtonensis Mains 1947

== Y ==
- Cordyceps yahagiana Kobayasi & Shimizu 1980
- Cordyceps yaoluopingensis Y. Yang, Y.P. Xiao & X. Luo 2022
- Cordyceps yinjiangensis Y.P. Li, W.H. Chen, Y.F. Han & Z.Q. Liang 2020

== Members of Cordyceps s. s. with a different preferred name ==
- Cordyceps bassiana Z.Z. Li, C.R. Li, B. Huang & M.Z. Fan 2001 is better accepted as Beauveria bassiana
- Cordyceps confragosa (Mains) G.H. Sung, J.M. Sung, Hywel-Jones & Spatafora 2007
- Cordyceps locustiphila Henn 1904
- Cordyceps scarabaeicola Kobayasi 1976
- Cordyceps staphylinidicola ex Kobayasi & Shimizu 1982 originally as "C. staphylinidaecola"
- Cordyceps tuberculata (Lebert) Maire 1917

== Notes ==
In addition, species moved to or described in the genus after Sung's re-circumscription in 2007 may be assumed to belong to Cordyceps sensu stricto.
