= Penicillium phoeniceum =

Scientific classification
- Kingdom: Fungi
- Division: Ascomycota
- Class: Eurotiomycetes
- Order: Eurotiales
- Family: Aspergillaceae
- Genus: Penicillium
- Species: P. phoeniceum

Binomial name
- Penicillium phoeniceum Beyma, F.H. van. 1933

Type strain
- ATCC 10481, CBS 249.32, FAT 1292, FRR 2070, IAM 13724, IFO 5801, IJFM 5122, IMI 040585, JCM 22782, KP 173, MUCL 38795, NBRC 5801, NRRL 2070, QM 7608, VKM F-321

Synonyms
- Penicillium roseololilacinum, Penicillium ovetense

Species of fungus

Penicillium phoeniceum is an anamorph, saprotrophic species of the genus of Penicillium which produces oosporein, phoenicine and phenicin.
