= Cordyceps chanhua =

Scientific classification
- Kingdom: Fungi
- Division: Ascomycota
- Class: Sordariomycetes
- Order: Hypocreales
- Family: Cordycipitaceae
- Genus: Cordyceps
- Species: C. chanhua

Binomial name
- Cordyceps chanhua Z.Z. Li, F.G. Luan, Hywel-Jones, C.R. Li & S.L. Zhang, 2021

Synonyms
- Technically none, but see list of misattributed names in § Taxonomy.

Species of fungi

Cordyceps chanhua is an ascomycete fungus that parasitizes cicada larvae found in Southern China. It forms white and yellow asexual fruiting structures resembling synnema. It is known in Traditional Chinese Medicine as Chan Hua which means "cicada flower". Its medicinal uses date back to the fifth century AD in China. It can also be used in various foods and tonics.

Chan-hua is previously misidentified as Isaria cicadae, another pathogen of cicada larvae. However, this name describes a fungus found in Brazil in 1838 with significant morphological and DNA differences. Other misattributed names include Cordyceps cicadae and Cordyceps sobolifera. Due to widespread misidentification, "Isaria cicadae" has been reported to exist on other continents.

== Taxonomy ==
Isaria cicadae is a severely misused name. It was originally described as Isaria cicadae Miq. by Miquel in 1838 using a Brazilian sample until he synonymized it with C. cicadae in 1895. Paecilomyces cicadae was synonymized with C. cicadae in 1974 by Samson. Soon after, S.Z. Shing described a Cordyceps cicadae Shing in 1975, but a fairly different sample from China is used.

Each of the following is a different species:

- Isaria cicadae Miq. 1838, which is the same as Cordyceps cicadae (Miq.) Massee 1895 and Paecilomyces cicadae. The preferred name for this species appears to be Cordyceps cicadae (Miq.) Massee 1895, especially since Isaria has proven to be polyphyletic.
- Cordyceps cicadae Shing 1975, which is now properly known as Tolypocladium dujiaolongae Y.P. Cao & C.R. Li after its local name in TCM ("Du Jiao Long"). Some Chinese sources believe that it is the teleomorph of "Chan Hua", which is now proven false with the discovery of its true teleomorph.
- Cordyceps sobolifera (now Ophiocordyceps sobolifera). Japanese sources incorrectly believe that this is the teleomorph of "Chan Hua", but it is in reality another TCM material known as "Xiao Chan Hua" (small cicada flower). The error has spread to Korean, Taiwanese, and Chinese sources.
- Cordyceps kobayasii, another purported teleomorph of "Chan Hua".
- Cordyceps chanhua Z.Z. Li et al., which is the correct name of "Chan Hua".

In traditional medicine-related papers, each of the names have been used to describe the material known as "Chan Hua". C. cicadae and I. cicadae used to be very common in sources written by Chinese researchers, though they have largely adopted the corrected C. chanhua name. Japanese, Korean, and Taiwanese sources still use C. sobolifera.

Other reported synonyms include Cordyceps zhejiangensis and C. sinclairii.

== Description ==
C. chanhua forms its fruiting structures on the surface of its host, a cicada nymph. The fruiting structure can either cover the entire nymph body or only partially cover it. Sexual structures are not produced on these fruiting structures. Much more information is known about the asexual morph of this fungus because the sexual morph has been reportedly observed once in nature and never in the lab. Its asexual fruiting structures are synnema-like and produce conidiophores and conidia. The fruiting bodies have yellow stalk-looking structures with a white-ish, fluffy tip where the conidiophores are located.

== Ecology ==
C. chanhua is an entomogenous fungi that parasitizes the nymphs of its cicada hosts and forms fruiting structures on the surface. These fruiting structures are produced from June–August, and they protrude from the nymph, up through the soil after the fungus kills it. Asexual means of reproduction occur once temperatures rise following sclerotium development and is done so through conidia, dispersed by air and water. It is said that this fungal species is rare and scarce because it propagates slowly and lacks resistance. This could also be due to the fact that it is largely asexual and clonal in nature, as sexual structures have yet to be reliably observed in lab or in nature. Despite this, there is evidence supporting that it is heterothallic being that a study found a truncated MAT_{1-1-1} type found in the MAT_{1-2} locus that is not due to asexual fruiting.

Its genome has been sequenced and found to be 33.9Mb including serine proteases and chintinases which target host tissues and are characteristic of other entomopathogenic fungi. The fungus also produces metabolites such as beauvericins and oosporein which have non-selective insecticidal properties. This would suggest that the fungus could infect more than one host, but this has only been seen in the lab on silkworm pupae and beetle wings.

== Life cycle ==
The life cycle of C. chanhua in southern China as observed and described by Zha, Ling-Sheng et al. in 2019 follows. During mid-late summer, conidia of C. chanhua attach to the surface of a cicada nymph's body within the soil which germinate and form germ tubes that can penetrate below the surface and form hyphae. After two to three days of absorbing the cicada's nutrients and reproducing, they can occupy the entire body. Hyphae turn to mycelia which cause the nymph to die from absorbing water and nutrients and producing mycotoxins. After the nymph is killed, the fungus forms a sclerotium and produce antibiotics to keep the body from rotting. When temperatures rise again, either that year or the following, mycelia are produced once more to form synnemata that eventually break through the soil to grow above ground. The synnema branches to form multiple conidiophores and chained conidia. The conidia are dispersed by air or water, leading them back to the soil, where they use water flow to infiltrate the soil until they make contact with another nymph and infect.

== Habitat and distribution ==
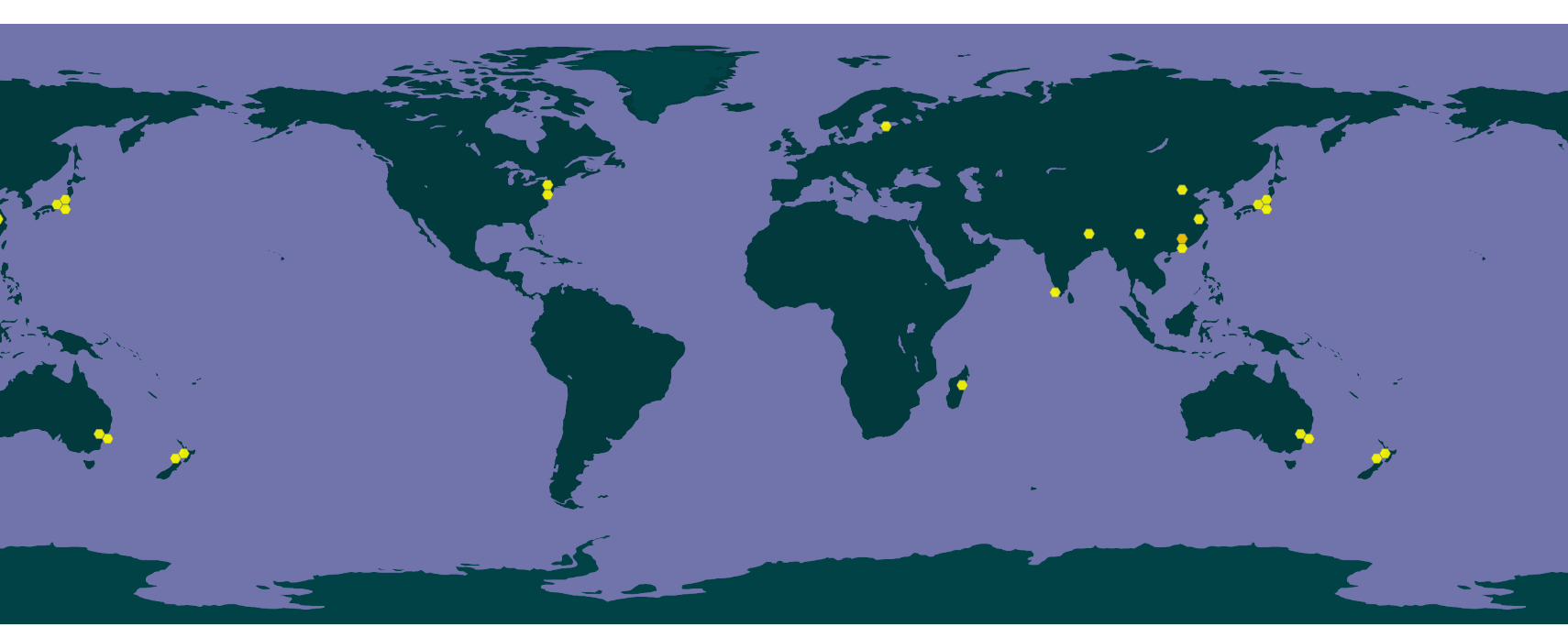
Reported range of fungi identified as any one of: "Isaria cicadae", "Cordyceps cicadae", and "Paecilomyces cicadae".

Cordyceps chanhua is found in warm, humid, low-elevational regions (below 2,500m), on cicada nymphs in sunny soils. Habitats that fit these criteria include bamboo, broad-leaved, coniferous, and broad-leaved mixed forests.

Fungi reported to be "chan-hua" or Cordyceps cicadae are most commonly found in China, but they are also found across Asia, Europe, and North America, with some studies showing other continents as well. As newer taxonomic data has shown, this view involves a great deal of conflation.

== Medicinal properties ==
C. chanhua is one of the oldest, most valued and well-known forms of Traditional Chinese Medicine, dating back to the fifth century AD. When used as a medicine, it is referred to as Chan Hua. Many of its medicinal properties relate it to the more commonly used Cordyceps sinensis and Cordyceps militaris, making it a potential substitute for these highly sought after medicinal fungi. Obstacles to using Chan-hua on a larger scale alongside its relatives C. sinensis and C. militaris include its scarcity and its cryptic taxonomy which make it difficult to study, cultivate, and harvest. It has been shown to be helpful for a multitude of health issues and concerns and nonsignificant toxicity has been reported meaning it is thought to be safe to use as treatment. On the other hand, oosporein, which is produced by the fungus, has been shown to cause issues in some species including birds and canines. Oxalic acid also produced by the fungus could be cause for kidney stone disease in high levels.

=== Putative active functions ===
- Treatment of childhood convulsion
- Analgesic activity and sedative function
- Anti-fatigue effects
- Antitumor activity
- Amelioration of renal malfunction
- Immunomodulatory effects
- Immunoregulatory

=== Medicinal uses and treatments ===
- Malaria
- Palpitations
- Cancer
- Fever
- Diabetes
- Eye diseases
- Dizziness
- Chronic kidney diseases
- Acute conjunctivitis
- Chronic blepharitis, dacryocystitis, and pterygium

=== Other uses ===
- Improving eyesight, removing eye cloudiness
- Neuroprotection
- Promoting eruption
- Liver and kidney protection
- Blood fat reduction

== Chemical constituents ==
Chemicals isolated from Chan-hua include nucleotides and nucleosides, sterols (ergosterol, mannitol), cyclic dipeptides, sugars, polysaccharides, fatty acids, amino acids, aromatic compounds, galactomannan, adenosine, uridine, inosine, guanosine, cyclopeptides, myriocin, and inorganic elements.
