= Arena Pharmaceuticals =

American healthcare company

Arena Pharmaceuticals, Inc.
- Company type: Subsidiary
- Traded as: Nasdaq: ARNA
- Industry: Biotechnology
- Founded: 1997; 29 years ago
- Founders: Jack Lief; Dominic Behan
- Headquarters: San Diego, California, U.S.
- Key people: Dominic Behan (senior scientist); Amit Munshi (CEO); Kevin Lind (CFO)
- Products: Belviq
- Revenue: ▲US$27,600,000 (FY 2012)
- Operating income: ▼US$−57,000,000 (FY 2012)
- Net income: ▼US$−85,500,000 (FY 2012)
- Total assets: ▲US$261,000,000 (FY 2012)
- Total equity: ▲US$98,600,000 (FY 2012)
- Parent: Pfizer
- Website: arenapharm.com

Arena Pharmaceuticals, Inc. is an American biopharmaceutical company founded in 1997 and headquartered in San Diego, California. The company has small molecule drugs in development for possible clinical utility in multiple therapeutic areas. The company's most advanced investigational clinical programs are ralinepag (formerly APD811) in testing for pulmonary arterial hypertension (PAH), etrasimod (formerly APD334) in evaluation for inflammatory indications and APD371 for the treatment of pain associated with Crohn's disease. In 2016, the company downsized and shifted its focus to developing new drugs currently being tested in clinical trials. In December 2021, Pfizer announced that it had agreed to acquire Arena for $6.7 billion in cash. In March 2022, it was announced the acquisition by Pfizer had been concluded.

== History ==
Arena Pharmaceuticals Inc. is an American biopharmaceutical company founded in 1997 and headquartered in San Diego, California. Arena focused on discovering drugs that act on G protein-coupled receptors (GPCRs). The company developed technology it called Constitutively Activated Receptor Technology (CART) that identified drug leads targeting GPCRs and other classes of receptors. CART was used to identify drug leads able to act as receptor inhibitors to decrease a biological response or act as receptor activators to increase a biological response.

- In January 2000, Arena entered into a collaborative agreement with Fujisawa Pharmaceutical Co. Ltd. to validate up to 13 drug targets.
- In April 2000, Arena entered into a research collaboration with Eli Lilly and Company focused on the endocrine and central nervous systems.
- In May 2000, Arena entered into a research collaboration with Taisho Pharmaceutical Co. focused on several GPCRs selected by Taisho in therapeutic areas of interest.

== Products ==
The company has one drug on the market, Belviq (lorcaserin), a weight-loss medication. The U.S. Food and Drug Administration (FDA) approved lorcaserin on June 27, 2012. The company committed to a sales force commitment of 200. Lorcaserin is approved for use in adults with a body mass index (BMI) of 30 or greater, which is considered obese, or adults with a BMI of 27 or greater and who have at least one weight-related health condition, such as high blood pressure, type 2 diabetes, or high cholesterol. However, sales of Belviq were disappointing. In 2015, the company laid off 80 workers; this was followed in July 2016 by the layoff of another 100 employees (approximately 73% of remaining workforce). In January 2017, Arena announced that it is selling Belviq to its Japanese partner, Eisai Co. Ltd., which will manufacture and market the drug; Arena will draw a royalty on global sales.

The sale completes a pivot in emphasis toward drugs still under development. Drugs in the company's pipeline includes medications designed to treat pain, ulcerative colitis and pulmonary arterial hypertension. As of September 2014, potential products that had not yet been approved by the FDA included Temanogrel (thrombotic diseases), Ralinepag (pulmonary arterial hypertension), APD334 (autoimmune disease), APD371 (pain), and Nelotanserin.

In 2018, Arena's etrasimod, a drug directed at treating ulcerative colitis (and a competitor with ozanimod from Celgene), passed phase II clinical trials successfully and moved on to phase III.

== See also ==
- List of biotechnology companies
