= Ponesimod =

Medication for the treatment of multiple sclerosis

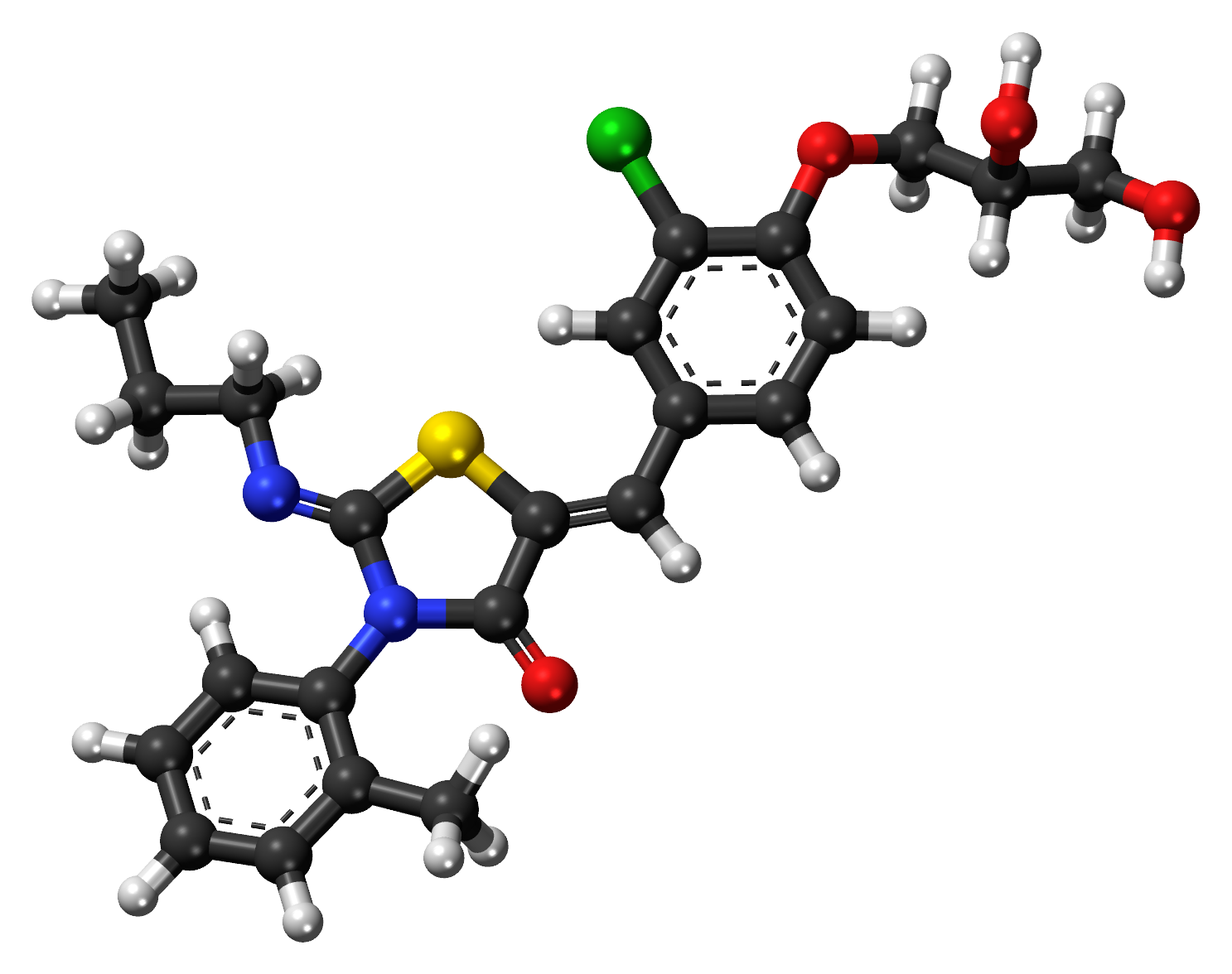

Clinical data
- Trade names: Ponvory
- Other names: ACT-128800
- AHFS/Drugs.com: Micromedex Detailed Consumer Information
- License data: US DailyMed: Ponesimod
- Pregnancy category: AU: D
- Routes of administration: By mouth
- ATC code: L04AE04 (WHO)

Legal status
- Legal status: AU: S4 (Prescription only); CA: ℞-only; US: ℞-only; EU: Rx-only

Pharmacokinetic data
- Metabolism: 2 main metabolites
- Elimination half-life: 31–34 hrs
- Excretion: Feces (57–80%, 26% unchanged), urine (10–18%)

Identifiers
- IUPAC name: (2Z,5Z)-5-[3-chloro-4-((2R)-2,3-dihydroxypropoxy)benzylidene]-3-(2-methylphenyl)-2-(propylimino)-1,3-thiazolidin-4-one
- CAS Number: 854107-55-4
- PubChem CID: 11363176
- DrugBank: DB12016
- ChemSpider: 9538103
- UNII: 5G7AKV2MKP
- KEGG: D11215
- ChEMBL: ChEMBL1096146
- CompTox Dashboard (EPA): DTXSID50234631
- ECHA InfoCard: 100.286.116

Chemical and physical data
- Formula: C_{23}H_{25}ClN_{2}O_{4}S
- Molar mass: 460.97 g·mol^{−1}
- 3D model (JSmol): Interactive image
- SMILES: CCC/N=C1\S/C(=C\c2ccc(OC[C@H](O)CO)c(Cl)c2)C(=O)N1c1ccccc1C
- InChI: InChI=1S/C23H25ClN2O4S/c1-3-10-25-23-26(19-7-5-4-6-15(19)2)22(29)21(31-23)12-16-8-9-20(18(24)11-16)30-14-17(28)13-27/h4-9,11-12,17,27-28H,3,10,13-14H2,1-2H3/b21-12-,25-23-/t17-/m1/s1; Key:LPAUOXUZGSBGDU-STDDISTJSA-N

Ponesimod, sold under the brand name Ponvory, is a medication for the treatment of multiple sclerosis. It is a sphingosine-1-phosphate receptor modulator.

The most common side effects include upper respiratory tract infection, hepatic transaminase elevation, and hypertension.

Ponesimod was approved for medical use in the United States in March 2021, and in the European Union in June 2021.

== Medical uses ==
Ponesimod is indicated for the treatment of relapsing forms of multiple sclerosis including clinically isolated syndrome, relapsing-remitting disease, and active secondary progressive disease.

== Adverse effects ==
Common adverse effects in studies were temporary bradycardia (slow heartbeat), usually at the beginning of the treatment, dyspnoea (breathing difficulties), and increased liver enzymes (without symptoms). No significant increase of infections was observed under ponesimod therapy. QT prolongation is detectable but was considered to be too low to be of clinical importance in a study.

== Mechanism of action ==
Like fingolimod, which is already approved for the treatment of multiple sclerosis, ponesimod blocks the sphingosine-1-phosphate receptor. This mechanism prevents lymphocytes (a type of white blood cells) from leaving lymph nodes. Ponesimod is selective for subtype 1 of this receptor, S1P_{1}.

== History ==
=== Clinical trials ===
In a 2009–2011 Phase II clinical trial including 464 multiple sclerosis patients, ponesimod treatment resulted in fewer new active brain lesions than placebo, measured during the course of 24 weeks.

In a 2010–2012 Phase II clinical trial including 326 patients with psoriasis, 46 or 48% of patients (depending on dosage) had a reduction of at least 75% Psoriasis Area and Severity Index (PASI) score compared to placebo in 16 weeks. The approval is already applied for in 2020.

In a 2015–2019 Phase III randomised, double-blind clinical trial of 1133 adult patients with relapsing multiple sclerosis, those under ponesimod treatment showed a 30% reduction in annual relapse rate and a significantly reduced number of new inflammatory lesions on brain MRI by 56% compared to those taking teriflunomide.

In October 2020, Janseen-Cilag International NV submitted an application for the modification of agreed pediatric investigation plan (PIP) to European Medicines Agency (including deferral and waiver criteria). This application was launched for the amendments of proposed changes against the European Medicines Agency’s decisions issued in November 2012 and April 2018. The approved procedure has already started in December 2022. To evaluate pharmacodynamics and pharmacokinetics efficacy of ponesimod in pediatric patients with relapsing-remitting multiple sclerosis (RRMS); a multicenter, randomized, double blind clinical study of duration of 108 weeks treatment for age group 10 to less than 18 years, is in progress. The clinical trial will end in November 2027.

== Society and culture ==
=== Legal status ===
In March 2021, the Committee for Medicinal Products for Human Use (CHMP) of the European Medicines Agency (EMA) adopted a positive opinion, recommending the granting of a marketing authorisation for the medicinal product Ponvory, intended for the treatment of active relapsing forms of multiple sclerosis. The applicant for this medicinal product is Janssen-Cilag International N.V. Ponesimod was approved for medical use in the European Union in May 2021.
