= Etrasimod =

Medication

- Skeletal formula of etrasimod

Clinical data
- Trade names: Velsipity
- Other names: APD334, APD-334
- AHFS/Drugs.com: Monograph
- MedlinePlus: a623050
- License data: US DailyMed: Etrasimod
- Pregnancy category: AU: D
- Routes of administration: By mouth
- Drug class: Sphingosine-1-phosphate receptor modulator
- ATC code: L04AE05 (WHO)

Legal status
- Legal status: AU: S4 (Prescription only); CA: ℞-only; US: ℞-only; EU: Rx-only

Pharmacokinetic data
- Protein binding: 97.9%
- Metabolism: Liver (CYP2C8, 2C9, 3A4)
- Elimination half-life: 30 hours
- Excretion: Feces (82%), kidneys (5%)

Identifiers
- IUPAC name: 2-((3R)-7-{[4-cyclopentyl-3-(trifluoromethyl)phenyl]methoxy}-1,2,3,4-tetrahydrocyclopenta[b]indol-3-yl)acetic acid
- CAS Number: 1206123-37-6; as arginine: 1206123-97-8
- PubChem CID: 44623998
- DrugBank: DB14766; as arginine: DBSALT003430
- ChemSpider: 52084233; as arginine: 57643656
- UNII: 6WH8495MMH; as arginine: MXE5EMA09L
- KEGG: D10930; as arginine: D10931
- ChEBI: CHEBI:229230
- ChEMBL: ChEMBL3358920

Chemical and physical data
- Formula: C_{26}H_{26}F_{3}NO_{3}
- Molar mass: 457.493 g·mol^{−1}
- 3D model (JSmol): Interactive image
- SMILES: O=C(O)C[C@H]1CCc2c1[nH]c1ccc(OCc3ccc(C4CCCC4)c(C(F)(F)F)c3)cc21
- InChI: InChI=1S/C26H26F3NO3/c27-26(28,29)22-11-15(5-8-19(22)16-3-1-2-4-16)14-33-18-7-10-23-21(13-18)20-9-6-17(12-24(31)32)25(20)30-23/h5,7-8,10-11,13,16-17,30H,1-4,6,9,12,14H2,(H,31,32)/t17-/m1/s1; Key:MVGWUTBTXDYMND-QGZVFWFLSA-N

Etrasimod, sold under the brand name Velsipity, is a medication that is used for the treatment of ulcerative colitis. It is a selective sphingosine-1-phosphate (S1P) receptor modulator that modifies the activity of the immune system. It is taken by mouth.

The most common side effects include lymphopenia (low levels of lymphocytes) and headache.

Etrasimod was discovered by Arena Pharmaceuticals, with subsequent development by Pfizer. Etrasimod was approved for medical use in the United States in October 2023, and in the European Union in February 2024.

== Medical uses ==
Etrasimod is used for the treatment of moderate to severe ulcerative colitis.

== Mechanism of action ==
It works by causing T cells to become trapped in the lymph nodes, preventing them from entering the bloodstream, from where they would travel to other tissues in the body and mediate inflammation.

== Society and culture ==
=== Legal status ===
Velsipity was approved by the US Food and Drug Administration (FDA) in October 2023.

In December 2023, the Committee for Medicinal Products for Human Use (CHMP) of the European Medicines Agency (EMA) adopted a positive opinion, recommending the granting of a marketing authorization for the medicinal product Velsipity, intended for the treatment of ulcerative colitis. The applicant for this medicinal product is Pfizer Europe MA EEIG. Etrasimod was approved for medical use in the European Union in February 2024.

=== Names ===
Etrasimod is the international nonproprietary name.
