= Cenerimod =

Chemical compound

Clinical data
- Other names: ACT-334441

Legal status
- Legal status: Investigational

Identifiers
- IUPAC name: (2S)-3-[4-[5-(2-cyclopentyl-6-methoxypyridin-4-yl)-1,2,4-oxadiazol-3-yl]-2-ethyl-6-methylphenoxy]propane-1,2-diol
- CAS Number: 1262414-04-9
- PubChem CID: 49871973
- IUPHAR/BPS: 9824
- DrugBank: DB12705
- ChemSpider: 52084350
- UNII: Y333RS1786
- KEGG: D11283
- ChEMBL: ChEMBL4297505

Chemical and physical data
- Formula: C_{25}H_{31}N_{3}O_{5}
- Molar mass: 453.539 g·mol^{−1}
- 3D model (JSmol): Interactive image
- SMILES: CCC1=C(C(=CC(=C1)C2=NOC(=N2)C3=CC(=NC(=C3)OC)C4CCCC4)C)OC[C@H](CO)O
- InChI: InChI=1S/C25H31N3O5/c1-4-16-10-18(9-15(2)23(16)32-14-20(30)13-29)24-27-25(33-28-24)19-11-21(17-7-5-6-8-17)26-22(12-19)31-3/h9-12,17,20,29-30H,4-8,13-14H2,1-3H3/t20-/m0/s1; Key:KJKKMMMRWISKRF-FQEVSTJZSA-N

Cenerimod is an investigational new drug that is being evaluated for the treatment of systemic lupus erythematosus. It is a sphingosine-1-phosphate receptor modulator.
