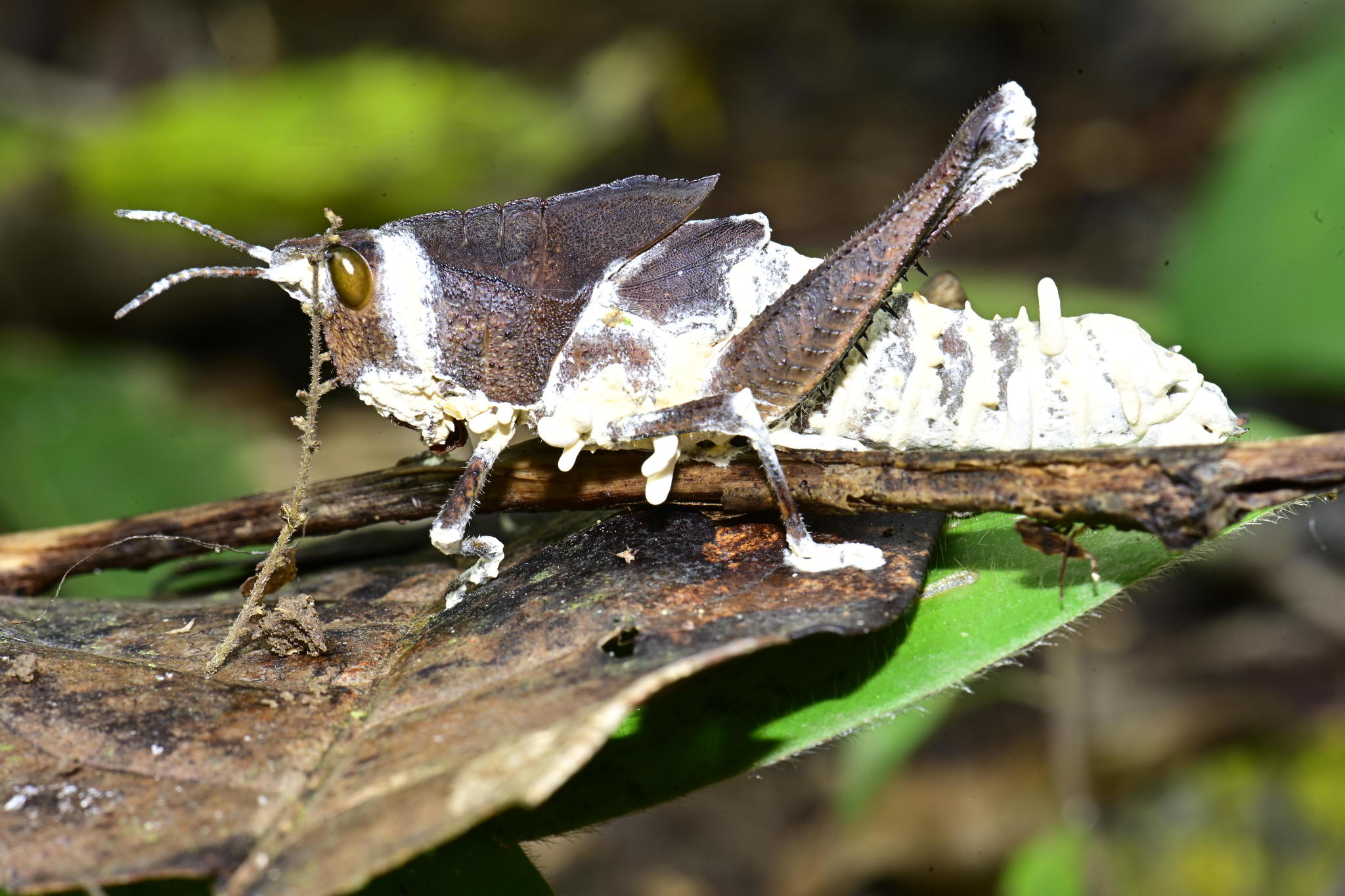

Scientific classification
- Kingdom: Fungi
- Division: Ascomycota
- Class: Sordariomycetes
- Order: Hypocreales
- Family: Cordycipitaceae
- Genus: Cordyceps
- Species: C. locustiphila

Binomial name
- Cordyceps locustiphila Henn. (1904)

Synonyms
- Beauveria locustiphila Shrestha. (2017)

= Cordyceps locustiphila =

Species of fungus

Cordyceps locustiphila is the basionym and teleomorph of the fungi Beauveria locustiphila, a species of fungus in the family Cordycipitaceae. and is a species within the genus Cordyceps. It was originally described in by Henn in 1904. C. locustiphila is an entomopathogen and obligate parasite of the grasshopper species within the genus Colpolopha or Tropidacris, and as such is endemic to South America. The scientific name is derived from its close relationship with its host, being named after locusts. The fungi was renamed to Beauveria locustiphila in 2017 following research into the family Cordycipitaceae. Following the loss of the species type specimen, new studies were conducted that now recommend that the fungi be divided into 3 species. C. locustiphila, C. diapheromeriphila, and C. acridophila.

== Description ==
=== Macroscopic characteristics ===
The fruiting bodies of Cordyceps locustiphila form gregariously as clubs through breaks and joints in the chitinous shell of their host locusts. The stipe of the club is a fleshy greyish yellow with a length of 1–4 mm long and a diameter of 1–2 mm. The stromata formed on the ends of the club are bright yellow and have a simple, claviform, body plan, ranging from 3–5 mm in length and 2–4 mm in width. Ovoid perithecia are semi-immersed within the walls of the stoma, and have a wall smaller than 50 micrometers.

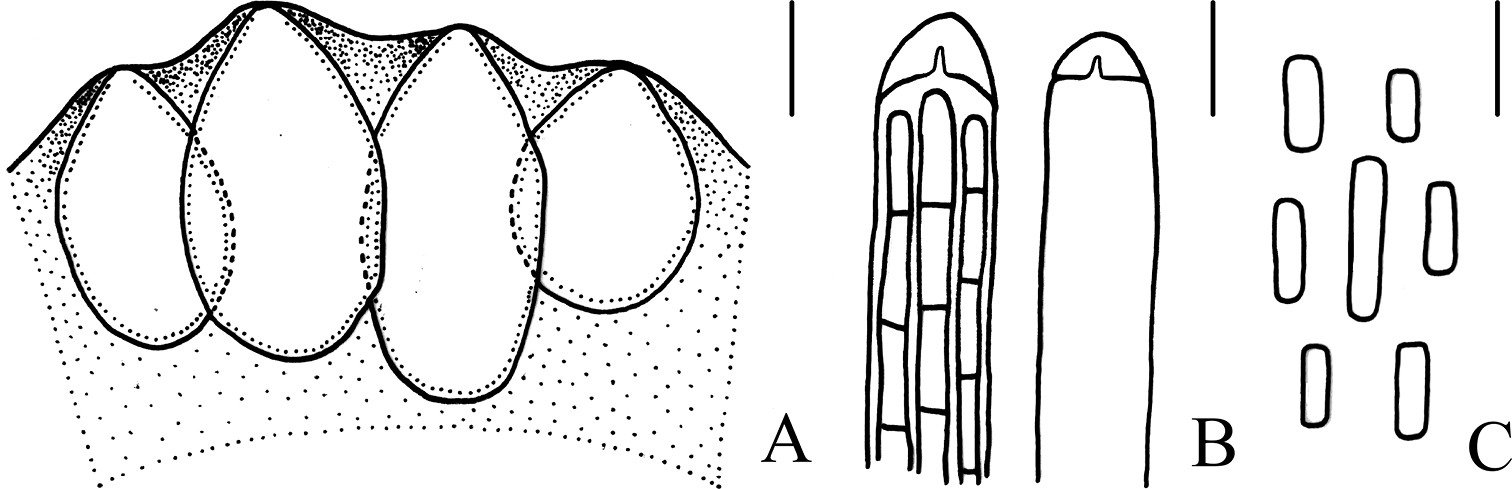
general diagram of perithecium in genus Cordyceps

=== Microscopic characteristics ===
The anamorph of this fungi forms as an ocher yellow hyphal network which turns white at the external margins. The hyphae have a diameter of 1.5–2.5 nanometers. The fungi produces conidiophores with acremonium-like phialides that are simple and erect from the hyphal mat. Conidia are cylindrical in appearance, and are produced solitarily, or via the slime drop method. This asexual phase is what spurned the reclassification as a Beauveria species

== Ecology and dispersal ==
C. locustiphila has evolved to be closely dependent on its host species, grasshoppers in the genus Colpolopha. As such, it is limited to the range of this grasshopper, and are endemic to South America, including regions of north-central Argentina, Northern Chile, Southern Brazil, and south east Peru.

The fungus colonizes the bodies of its host when ascospores become trapped on the chitin exoskeleton by the grasshoppers fine hairs and begin to germinate. As the mycelium develops, it breaks through the exoskeleton to invade the interior cavities of the insects body for protection during growth. The fungi then uses the insect as a source of nutrients and shelter for its lifespan.

When it is time to reproduce and disperse spores, the mycelium produces stroma that emerge through gaps and joints in the exoskeleton. Ascospores are then released by semi-embedded Perithecia in the stroma's wall to be dispersed by the wind. Similar to other Cordyceps species, C. locustiphila has shown to be able to influence the neurological processes of its host to "brainwash" the locust into positioning itself where the wind currents and environments are most beneficial for spore dispersion.

== Human uses ==
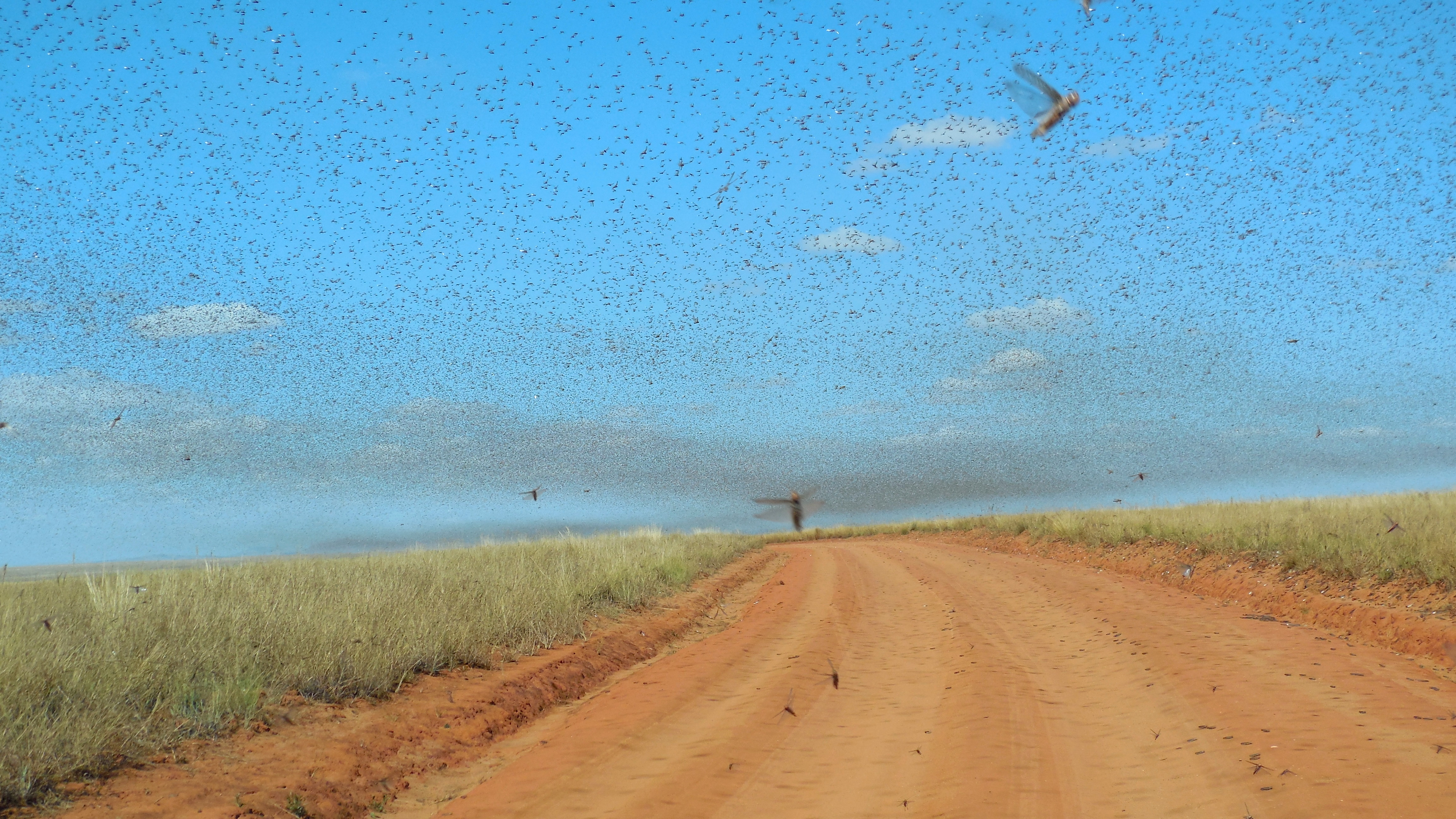
a swarm of locust ravaging cropland in Madagascar

C. locustiphila is a species of specific scientific interest due to its abilities as an entomopathogen. C. locustiphila poses no threat to human beings, but the locust it targets can pose severe threats to human agriculture and lead to famines in South America. As such, C. locustiphila has been the subject of research both for its mechanism of breaching chitin defenses in general, as well as possible use as a biological alternative to pesticides in order to maintain agricultural security while reducing pollutants.

Unlike other Cordyceps species, which have been used in traditional medicine across Asia, C. locustiphila has not been recorded as being used as a medicine or nutrient source at this time.

== Classification uncertainty ==
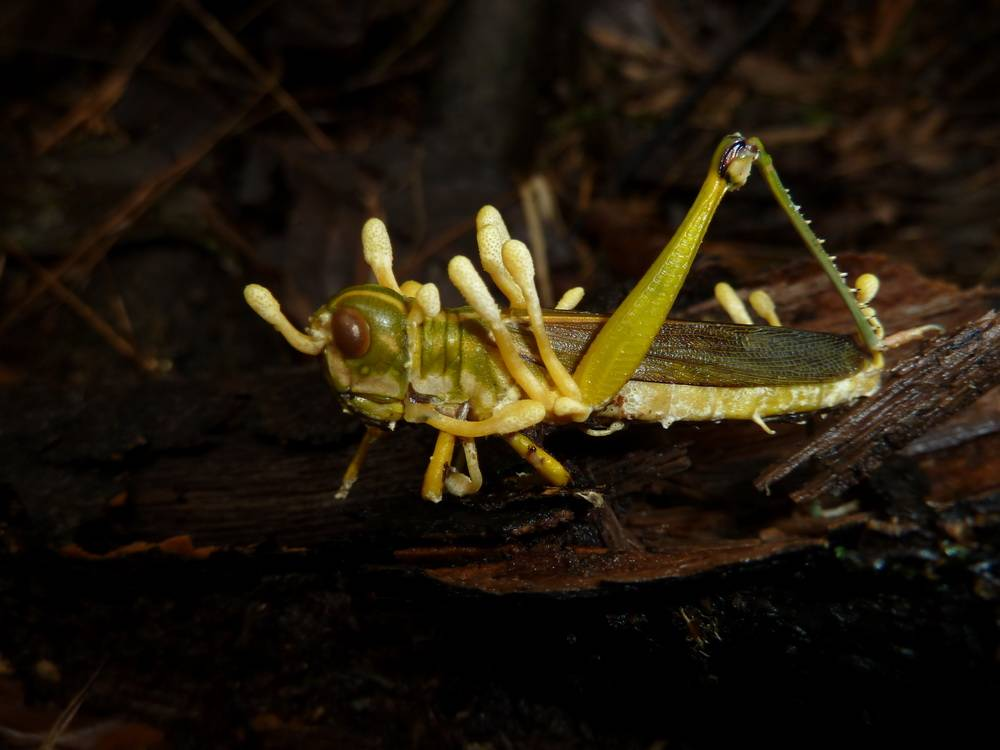
C. locustiphila emerging from the joints of its host

C. locustiphila was originally classified in 1904, but in 2017 was determined to be the teleomorph of Beauveria locustiphila, a species within a Cordyceps clade of asexually reproducing entomopathogens, Beauveria. This confusion is derived from the variations of sexual and asexual stages of the species lifecycle, as is a part of the larger changes taking place amongst fungal taxonomy due to the increase of DNA testing and research. Due to taxonomic standard changes implemented as part of the "One Fungus One Name" initiative B. locustiphila will not unseat the name C. locustiphila, being the more widespread teleomorph name of the species until such time it is ratified by the International Botanical Congress

Following further research of C. locustiphila's interactions with its host species, as well as genetic testing of the SSU, LSU, TEF, RPB1 and RPB2 nuclear loci, it has been recommended that the species be further divided into 3 species, Cordyceps locustiphila, Cordyceps diapheromeriphila, and Cordyceps acridophila and/or Beauveria locustiphila, Beauveria diapheromeriphila and Beauveria acridophila.

These taxonomical complexities have been marked as a possible obstacle in C. locustiphila's use as a biological pesticide due to the further interactions and hybridizations the species would undergo should it be propagated widely.
