= Sphingosine-1-phosphate receptor =

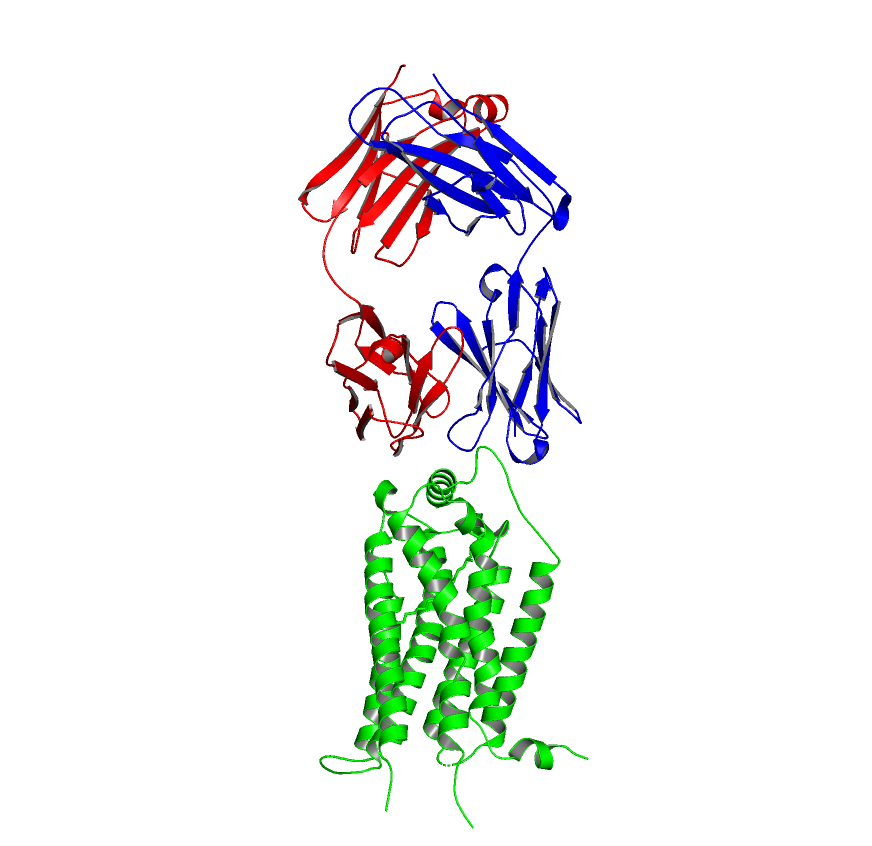
- Sphingosine-1-phosphate receptor rendering

Identifiers
- Symbol: ?

The sphingosine-1-phosphate receptors are a class of G protein-coupled receptors that are targets of the lipid signalling molecule Sphingosine-1-phosphate (S1P). They are divided into five subtypes: S1PR1, S1PR2, S1PR3, S1PR4 and S1PR5.

== Discovery ==
In 1990, S1PR1 was the first member of the S1P receptor family to be cloned from endothelial cells. Later, S1PR2 and S1PR3 were cloned from rat brain and a human genomic library respectively. Finally, S1P4 and S1PR5 were cloned from in vitro differentiated human dendritic cells and rat cDNA library.

== Function ==
The sphingosine-1-phosphate receptors regulate fundamental biological processes such as cell proliferation, angiogenesis, migration, cytoskeleton organization, endothelial cell chemotaxis, immune cell trafficking and mitogenesis. Sphingosine-1-phosphate receptors are also involved in immune-modulation and directly involved in suppression of innate immune responses from T cells.

== Subtypes ==
Sphingosine-1-phosphate (S1P) receptors are divided into five subtypes: S1PR1, S1PR2, S1PR3, S1PR4 and S1PR5.

They are expressed in a wide variety of tissues, with each subtype exhibiting a different cell specificity, although they are found at their highest density on leukocytes. S1PR1, 2 and 3 receptors are expressed ubiquitously. The expression of S1PR4 and S1PR5 are less widespread. S1PR4 is confined to lymphoid and hematopoietic tissues whereas S1PR5 primarily located in the white matter of the central nervous system (CNS) and spleen.

== G protein interactions and selective ligands ==
The sphingosine-1-phosphate (S1P) is the endogenous agonist for the five subtypes.

Receptor	G protein-coupled receptor superfamily	Agonists	Antagonists
S1PR1	G_{i}/G_{o} family	S1P; TC-SP 14 (CAS# 1257093-40-5); SEW 2871 (CAS# 256414-75-2); RP 001 hydrochloride (CAS# 1306761-53-4); CYM 5442 hydrochloride (CAS# 1094042-01-9); CS 2100 (CAS# 913827-99-3); Fingolimod (162359-55-9); Ozanimod (1306760-87-1); Ponesimod (854107-55-4)	W146 (CAS# 909725-62-8); VPC 23019 (CAS# 449173-19-7)
S1PR2	G_{s} family; G_{q}/G_{11} family; G_{12}/G_{13} family	S1P	JTE 013 (547756-93-4); AB1 (1463912-49-3)
S1PR3	G_{i}/G_{o} family; G_{q}/G_{11} family; G_{12}/G_{13} family	S1P; Fingolimod (162359-55-9)	VPC 23019 (CAS# 449173-19-7)
S1PR4	G_{i}/G_{o} family; G_{12}/G_{13} family	S1P; Fingolimod (162359-55-9)	CYM 50260 (CAS# 1355026-60-6); CYM 50308 (CAS# 1345858-76-5); JTE 013 (547756-93-4)
S1PR5	G_{i}/G_{o} family; G_{12}/G_{13} family	S1P; Fingolimod (162359-55-9); Ozanimod (1306760-87-1)	
