= Myriocin =

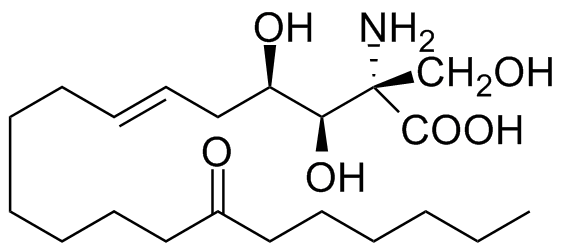
- Myriocin

Names
- Systematic IUPAC name (2S,3R,4R,6E)-2-Amino-3,4-dihydroxy-2-(hydroxymethyl)-14-oxoicos-6-enoic acid
- Other names Antibiotic ISP-1; Thermozymocidin

Identifiers
CAS Number	35891-70-4
3D model (JSmol)	Interactive image; Interactive image
Beilstein Reference	5113331
ChEBI	CHEBI:582124
ChEMBL	ChEMBL55076
ChemSpider	4942874 (2S,3R,4R,6E); 11654743 (6E); 266093 (); 21467337 (3S,4S,6E)
ECHA InfoCard	100.164.620
IUPHAR/BPS	6664
KEGG	C19914
PubChem CID	6438394 (6E); 301119 ()
RTECS number	JX3890000
UNII	YRM4E8R9ST
UN number	2811
CompTox Dashboard (EPA)	DTXSID9046360
- InChI: InChI=1S/C21H39NO6/c1-2-3-4-10-13-17(24)14-11-8-6-5-7-9-12-15-18(25)19(26)21(22,16-23)20(27)28/h9,12,18-19,23,25-26H,2-8,10-11,13-16,22H2,1H3,(H,27,28) Key: ZZIKIHCNFWXKDY-UHFFFAOYSA-N; InChI=1S/C21H39NO6/c1-2-3-4-10-13-17(24)14-11-8-6-5-7-9-12-15-18(25)19(26)21(22,16-23)20(27)28/h9,12,18-19,23,25-26H,2-8,10-11,13-16,22H2,1H3,(H,27,28)/b12-9+/t18-,19+,21+/m1/s1; InChI=1S/C21H39NO6/c1-2-3-4-10-13-17(24)14-11-8-6-5-7-9-12-15-18(25)19(26)21(22,16-23)20(27)28/h9,12,18-19,23,25-26H,2-8,10-11,13-16,22H2,1H3,(H,27,28)/b12-9+/t18-,19+,21+/m1/s1 Key: ZZIKIHCNFWXKDY-GNTQXERDSA-N
- SMILES: CCCCCCC(=O)CCCCCCC=CCC(O)C(O)C(N)(CO)C(O)=O; O=C(O)[C@@](N)([C@@H](O)[C@H](O)C/C=C/CCCCCCC(=O)CCCCCC)CO

Properties
Chemical formula	C_{21}H_{39}NO_{6}
Molar mass	401.54 g/mol
- Except where otherwise noted, data are given for materials in their standard state (at 25 °C [77 °F], 100 kPa). verify (what is ?) Infobox references

Myriocin, also known as antibiotic ISP-1 and thermozymocidin, is a non-proteinogenic amino acid derived from the entomopathogenic fungus, Isaria sinclairii.

Myriocin is a very potent inhibitor of serine palmitoyltransferase, the first step in sphingosine biosynthesis. Due to this property, it is used in biochemical research, as a tool for depleting cells of sphingolipids.

Myriocin was shown to inhibit the proliferation of an IL-2-dependent mouse cytotoxic T cell line.

Myriocin possesses immunosuppressant activity. It is reported to be 10- to 100-fold more potent than ciclosporin.

The multiple sclerosis drug fingolimod was derived from myriocin by using structure–activity relationship studies to determine the parts of the molecule important to its activity.
