= Oosporein =

Names
- IUPAC name 2-(2,5-dihydroxy-4-methyl-3,6-dioxocyclohexa-1,4-dien-1-yl)-3,6-dihydroxy-5-methylcyclohexa-2,5-diene-1,4-dione
- Other names: NSC 88466; Chaetomidin; Iso-Oosporein

Identifiers
CAS Number	475-54-7
3D model (JSmol)	Interactive image
ChemSpider	13565485
PubChem CID	135426831
UNII	708AUK232A
CompTox Dashboard (EPA)	DTXSID80963861
- InChI: InChI=1S/C14H10O8/c1-3-7(15)11(19)5(12(20)8(3)16)6-13(21)9(17)4(2)10(18)14(6)22/h15,17,20,22H,1-2H3 Key: DHMPJEGFPQTNFX-UHFFFAOYSA-N; Key: DHMPJEGFPQTNFX-UHFFFAOYSA-N
- SMILES: CC1=C(C(=O)C(=C(C1=O)O)C2=C(C(=O)C(=C(C2=O)O)C)O)O

Properties
Chemical formula	C_{14}H_{10}O_{8}
Molar mass	306.226 g·mol^{−1}
- Except where otherwise noted, data are given for materials in their standard state (at 25 °C [77 °F], 100 kPa). Infobox references

Oosporein is a toxic, bronze colored dibenzoquinone with the molecular formula C_{14}H_{10}O_{8}. Oosporein was first extracted from various molds and has antibiotic, antiviral, cytotoxic, antifungal, and Insecticide properties.
