= Heinrich Mückter =

Nazi doctor

Heinrich Mückter (14 June 1914 – 22 May 1987) was a German medical doctor, pharmacologist and chemist.

== World War II ==
During the Nazi occupation of Poland, Mückter was deputy director of the Kraków Institute for Typhus and Virus Research. Mückter and his colleagues repeatedly experimented on concentration camp prisoners in Buchenwald. Many prisoners died as a result of the experiments.

Accused by Polish war crimes prosecutors of conducting medical experiments on concentration camp prisoners and Nazi forced labourers, Mückter escaped arrest and fled to West Germany.

== Invention of thalidomide ==
In 1946 Mückter became Head of Research at the Grünenthal pharmaceutical company, where he further developed the infamous drug thalidomide which had been synthesized in 1952 by Chemical Industry Basel. Aggressively-marketed as an over-the-counter sleeping pill and remedy for morning sickness in pregnancy, thalidomide was first made available on 1 October 1957, and it became the second best-selling medication in West Germany after Bayer Aspirin. (It was never approved for use in East Germany.) Thalidomide was eventually found to cause miscarriages, severe birth defects in babies whose mothers had taken the medication while pregnant, and severe nerve damage.

In January 1968, Mückter was put on trial along with other Grünenthal employees. The trial ended abruptly in April 1970 with a settlement.

Mückter was never charged in relation to his role in experiments on concentration camp prisoners, nor his role in the thalidomide scandal. He died on 22 May 1987.

== Literature ==
- Lukas Frank; Dominik Groß; Nico Biermanns (2026). "Before thalidomide: Heinrich Mückter and the Nazi typhus complex". Medical History. 70 (3): 449–475. doi:10.1017/mdh.2026.10059. PMC 13311347. PMID 42003515.
