= Grünenthal =

German pharmaceutical company

Grünenthal GmbH
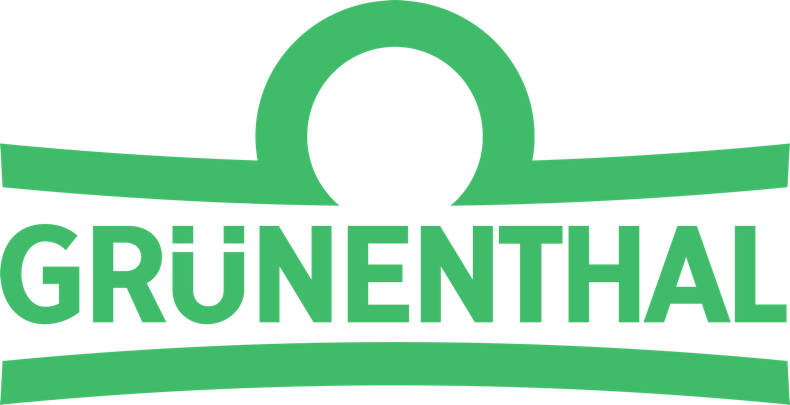

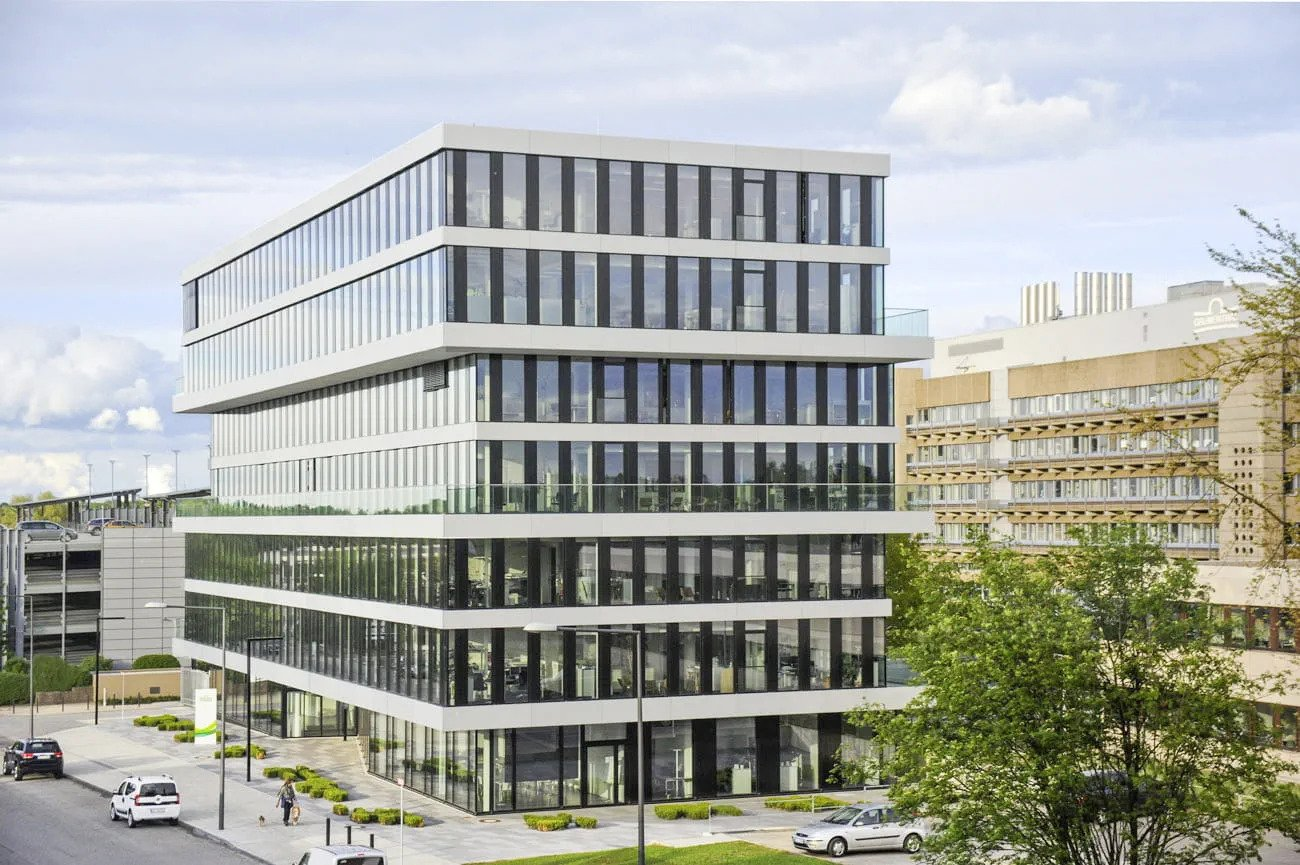
- Headquarters of Grünenthal
- Formerly: Chemie Grünenthal
- Type: Private
- Industry: Pharmaceutical
- Founded: 29 January 1946; 80 years ago in Stolberg, North Rhine-Westphalia, Germany
- Founder: Hermann Wirtz, Sr.
- Headquarters: Aachen, North Rhine-Westphalia, Germany
- Number of locations: 28 (commercial presence); 5 (manufacturing sites)
- Areas served: +100 countries worldwide
- Key people: Gabriel Baertschi (CEO); Fabian Raschke (CFO); Uli Brödl (CSO); Jan Adams (CCO)
- Products: Tapentadol; Thalidomide; Tramadol; etc.
- Revenue: ▲€1.8 billion (2023)
- Owner: Wirtz family
- Number of employees: 4,400 (2023)
- Website: www.grunenthal.com

Grünenthal GmbH is a German pharmaceutical company headquartered in Aachen in Germany. It was founded in 1946 as Chemie Grünenthal and has been continuously family-owned. The company was the first to introduce penicillin into the German market in the postwar period, after the Allied Control Council lifted its ban.

Grünenthal became infamous in the 1950s and 1960s for the development and sale of the teratogenic drug thalidomide, marketed as the sleeping pill Contergan and promoted as a morning sickness preventive. Thalidomide caused severe birth defects, miscarriages, and other severe health problems.

The company is leading in pain medications such as Tramadol, which was developed in-house. The company has two offices in Germany as well as subsidiaries in Europe, Latin America, the US, and China. In 2018, the company acquired Averitas Pharma, under which the company continues to operate in the US market.

== History ==
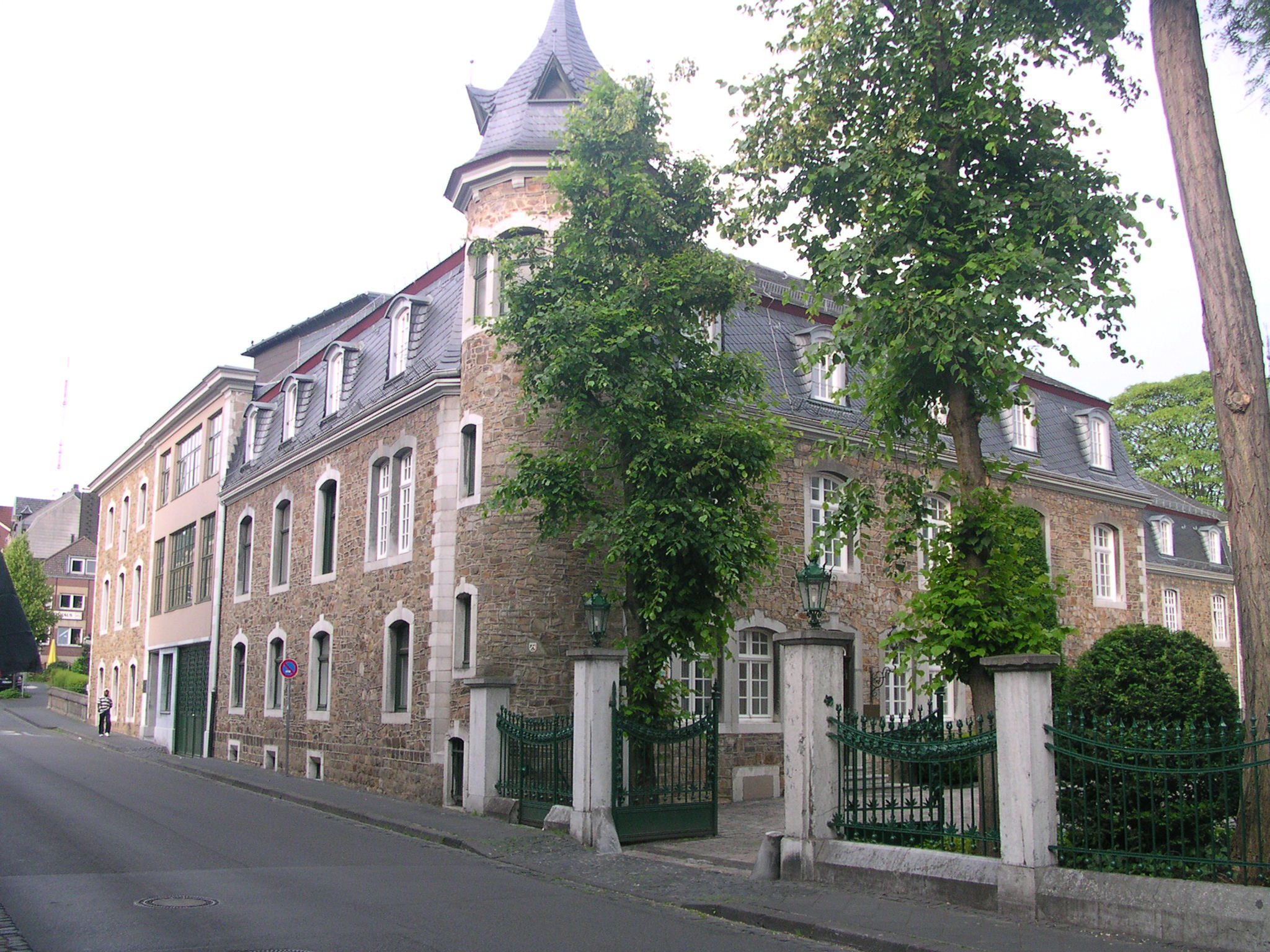
former headquarters in Stolberg

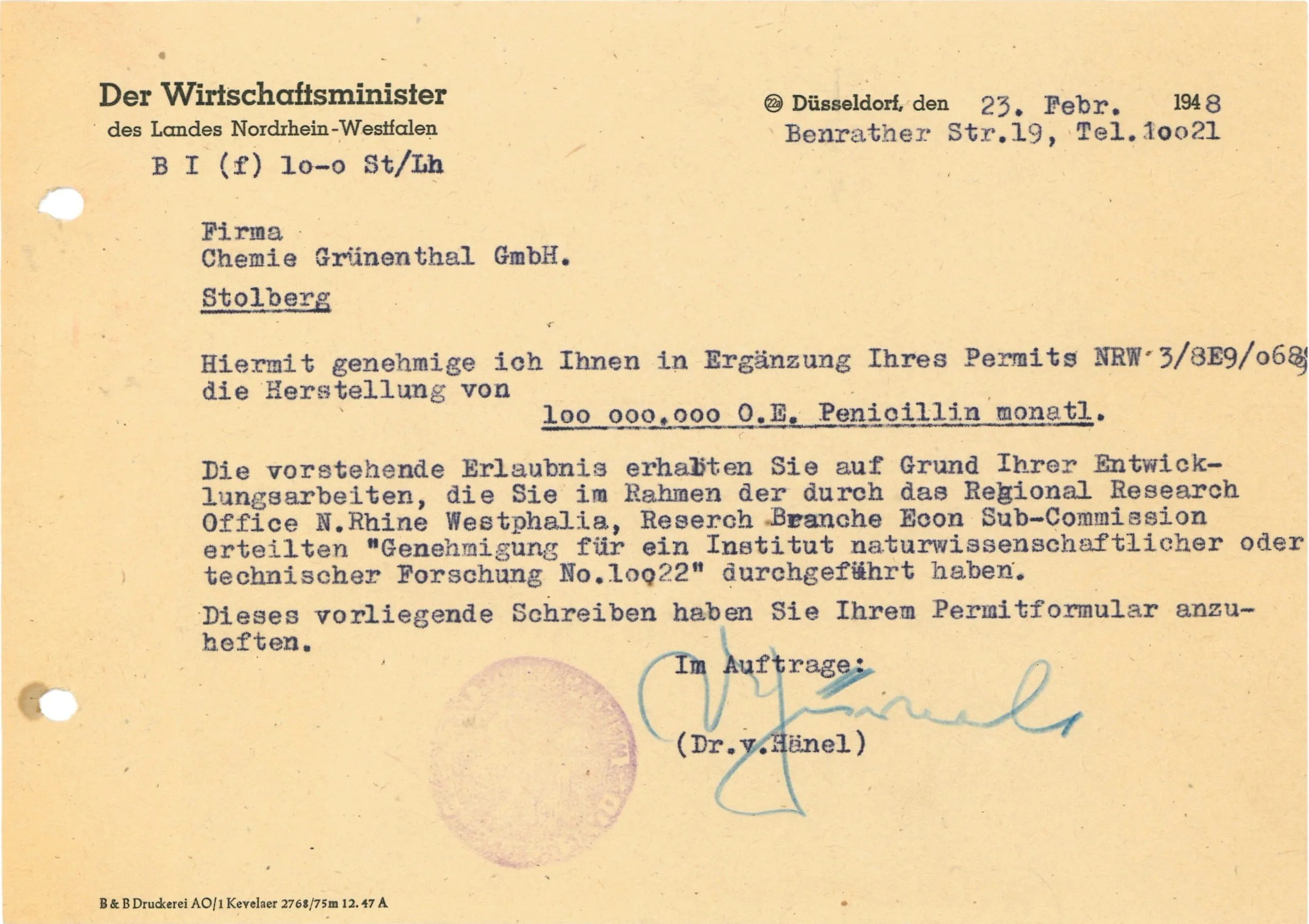
Permission for Grünenthal to produce penicillin, dated 23 February 1948

Chemie Grünenthal was founded in 1946 by Hermann Wirtz, Sr. as Chemie Grünenthal GmbH in Stolberg (Rhineland). Later, it was renamed Grünenthal GmbH, and its headquarters were moved to Aachen. The Allied Control Council had prohibited the research and manufacture of penicillin by German companies. When the ban was lifted, Grünenthal was the first company to introduce penicillin in the postwar period into the German market. This investment achieved a big financial boost for the company.

=== Thalidomide (Contergan) ===
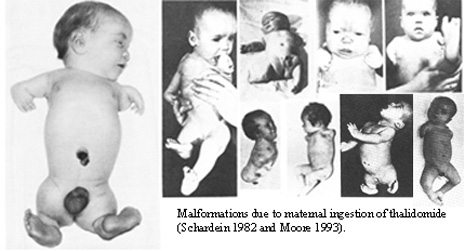
Cases of severe phocomelia induced by Thalidomide

Under its Head of Research Heinrich Mückter, a former Nazi scientist, Grünenthal synthesised thalidomide in 1954 and acquired a 20-year patent. Soon after obtaining its patent in April 1954, the company started clinical trials, and from November 1956, marketed the drug for the treatment of respiratory infections under the trade name Grippex, a combination drug that contained thalidomide, quinine, vitamin C, phenacetin, and acetylsalicylic acid. Researchers at Chemie Grünenthal also found that the drug was particularly effective for pregnant women suffering from morning sickness, although no trials were run with pregnant women. In 1957, the company began marketing thalidomide as Contergan.

In 1958, an unusual number of deformities in newborns were reported in Germany. However, scientists first assumed nuclear tests to be the reason for that. Only in late 1961, researchers found out that Contergan must be the cause. In November 1961, thalidomide was thus taken off the market.

Thalidomide caused severe deformities in the children of women who took the drug during pregnancy. Experts estimate that the drug thalidomide led to the death of about 2,000 children and serious birth defects in more than 10,000 children, about 5,000 of them in West Germany. East German regulatory authorities did not approve thalidomide, and the U.S. Food and Drug Administration (FDA) also declined to approve the drug. One reason for the initially unobserved side effects of the drug and the subsequent approval in Germany was that at that time drugs did not have to be tested for teratogenic effects. Thalidomide had only been tested on rodents, as was usual practice at the time.

In the UK, the British pharmaceutical company The Distillers Company (Biochemicals) Ltd, a subsidiary of Distillers Co. Ltd. (which became part of Diageo plc in 1997) marketed thalidomide under the brand name Distaval as a remedy for morning sickness throughout the United Kingdom, Australia, and New Zealand. Their advertisement claimed, "Distaval can be given with complete safety to pregnant women and nursing mothers without adverse effect on mother or child...Outstandingly safe Distaval has been prescribed for nearly three years in this country."

Around the world, more and more pharmaceutical companies started to produce and market the drug under license from Chemie Grünenthal. By the mid 1950s, 14 pharmaceutical companies were marketing thalidomide in 46 countries under 37 (some reports suggest 51) different trade names.

In the US, representatives from Chemie Grünenthal initially approached Smith-Kline and French with a request to market and distribute the drug in North America. The U.S. Food and Drug Administration refused to approve thalidomide for marketing and distribution. However, the drug was distributed in large quantities for testing purposes after the American distributor and manufacturer Richardson-Merrell had applied for its approval in September, 1960. The official in charge of the FDA, Frances Oldham Kelsey, did not rely on information from the company which did not include any test results. Richardson-Merrell was called on to perform tests and report the results. The company requested approval six times and was refused each time. Nevertheless, a total of 17 children with thalidomide-induced malformations were born.

A Long Island, New York family sued the drug maker after their twins were born with deformities in May 1961. Their son was born without arms, with hands growing from his shoulders, and their daughter suffered from a number of internal deformities. The mother was a German woman who had met her husband in 1959 while studying at the University of Florence. She came to the United States with Contergan tablets she had brought from Germany and a prescription from her physician. The lawsuit alleged that Chemie Grünenthal was negligent in the testing of thalidomide and that they failed to warn of its effects on unborn children.

By 1968, the company stated that thalidomide was not recommended for use "during pregnancy as such". The qualifying term obstetrics was employed. It was used in hindsight to strengthen the argument that doctors would interpret the word to mean that thalidomide was safe during the final stage of pregnancy only. This is a fallacious form of reasoning according to the German Medical Association, which defines obstetrics as starting with conception.

As a result of the thalidomide scandal, the health law in West Germany was strengthened and new requirements for pharmaceutical testing were created; the Federal Ministry of Health was established in 1962.

==== Criminal trial ====
In 1968, Grünenthal executives were tried for involuntary manslaughter. In 1970, the indictment was closed due to the minor guilt of the defendants and insufficient public interest in further proceedings.

==== Reparations ====
In 1970, Grünenthal paid DM 100 million to the Contergan Foundation for Disabled People, and the German government paid reparations of DM 320 million. Between 1997 and 2008, Grünenthal declined further payments to thalidomide victims. At the end of 2007, the British entrepreneur Nicholas Dobrik organised a group of victims and began an international campaign for further reparations. On 8 May 2008, Grünenthal announced it would voluntarily pay further €50 million to the Thalidomide Foundation to help to improve the lives of thalidomide victims.

==== Apology ====
In August 2012, the company issued its first apology in a half-century, saying it regretted the consequences of the drug. Harald Stock, Grunenthal's chief executive, said the company had failed to reach out "from person to person" to the victims and their mothers over the past 50 years. The company has refused to compensate the Spanish victims of the drug who have sued the company.

==== Leprosy treatment ====
In 1964, Israeli physician Jacob Sheskin discovered the positive effect of thalidomide in the treatment of leprosy. Since the 1970s, Grünenthal has delivered thalidomide tablets to leprosy clinics to cure leprosy. The delivery takes place under strict conditions and by virtue of an agreement with the World Health Organization. Grünenthal provided thalidomide to more than 1,000 patients with leprosy in the United States until a few months before July, 1986. The drug is especially helpful to patients with leprosy in treating an extremely painful allergic reaction of the skin. The company discontinued exporting thalidomide because of liability fears. A lack of insurance coverage for those requiring the drug was also a problem.

=== Versatis and Tapentadol cases ===
In July 2010, the British Prescription Medicines Code of Practice Authority (PMCPA) received complaints about a poster used by field-based teams at Grünenthal. It promoted the off-label use of Versatis, while the cost comparison analysis was flawed and misleading. The company stated that it had paid for the printing but no editorial control. Nevertheless, the Code of Practice was breached, and an undertaking was received.

In November 2010, the British Medicines and Healthcare products Regulatory Agency (MHRA) received an allegation that Grünenthal promoted its unlicensed product, Tapentadol, to health professionals. Grünenthal conducted an investigation and concluded that the allegation was unsubstantiated.

To date, the PMCPA website lists 16 completed cases involving Grünenthal.

=== Further drug development ===
The company has focused on the treatment of pain and is doing its own research and development in this field. Grünenthal developed the drug Tramadol, which is marketed under the brand name Tramal, one of the best-selling opioid painkillers. Other business units are gynecology, dermatology, and anti-infectives. Current products include the birth control pill Belara and the matrix pain patch Transtec. Unlike Tramadol, which is a Schedule IV(C-IV) medication, the drug Tapentadol HCl, as licensed by Grünenthal, is Schedule II(C-II) in the U.S. (meaning it is a potent agonist, therefore subject to abuse similar to other C-II opioids, such as oxycodone and morphine).

In November 2016, the company acquired Thar Pharmaceuticals.

In 2018, Grünenthal acquired European rights to the pain-related brands Nexium and Vimovo and the US-rights for Qutenza (capsaicin). The company began building a US structure to commercialise the latter asset through Averitas Pharma. Nexium has since been removed from the market due to kidney damage. This drug also did not have sufficient testing before it was brought to market. Later in 2018, Grünenthal obtained global rights for Qutenza.

In 2019, the company announced its intention to focus its research and development on areas such as peripheral neuropathic pain (PNP), chronic postoperative pain, osteoarthritis, and chronic back pain (including through modern approaches such as cell therapy).

In 2020, the cholesterol-lowering drug Crestor was acquired from AstraZeneca, and in 2022, the testosterone-based drug Nebido, used to treat hypogonadism, was acquired from Bayer for up to €500 million. In 2023, a portfolio of established drugs under the name Grünenthal Meds was purchased from Kyowa Kirin, followed in 2024 by the acquisition of Valinor and its product Movantik (naloxegol) for $250 million.

According to a press release, the company reached an agreement with Bayer in September 2026 to acquire the oral cancer drug Stivarga for up to €375 million.

== Social commitment ==
In 1998, the company launched the Grünenthal Foundation for Palliative Medicine. With its help, the first academic chair and clinic for palliative care was founded at the RWTH Aachen University in 2010.

Since 2004, Grünenthal supports young scientists through the EFIC-Grünenthal-Grant with €200,000 the world's largest prize in its field. Bursaries of up to €30,000 are awarded per project.

Since 2009, the company has been member of the social initiative Charta of Diversity. Also, it is founding member of the organization Voluntary Self-Regulation in the Pharmaceutical Industry.
