= Kefauver–Harris Amendment =

1962 United States federal health legislation

Drug Amendments of 1962
- Long title: An act to protect the public health by amending the Federal Food, Drug, and Cosmetic Act to assure the safety, effectiveness, and reliability of drugs, authorize standardization of drug names, and clarify and strengthen existing inspection authority; and for other purposes.
- Nicknames: Drug Efficacy Amendment; Kefauver–Harris Amendment
- Enacted by: the 87th United States Congress
- Effective: October 10, 1962

Citations
- Public law: 87-781
- Statutes at Large: 76 Stat. 780

Codification
- Acts amended: Federal Food, Drug, and Cosmetic Act
- Titles amended: 21 U.S.C.: Food and Drugs
- U.S.C. sections amended: 21 U.S.C. ch. 9 § 301 et seq.

Legislative history
- Introduced in the Senate as S. 1552 by Estes Kefauver (D–TN) on July 19, 1962; Committee consideration by Senate Judiciary Committee; Passed the Senate on August 23, 1962 (78–22); Passed the House on August 23, 1962 (passed); Reported by the joint conference committee on October 4, 1962; agreed to by the House on October 4, 1962 (347–88) and by the Senate on October 4, 1962 (passed); Signed into law by President John F. Kennedy on October 10, 1962

The U.S. Kefauver–Harris Amendment, "Drug Efficacy Amendment," or Drug Amendments of 1962 is an amendment to the Federal Food, Drug, and Cosmetic Act. The amendments were designed to strengthen drug regulation in the United States due to the thalidomide tragedy, which demonstrated the risks of unsafe and ineffective medications. The law required drug manufacturers to prove drugs were safe and effective, expanded the Food and Drug Administration (FDA) oversight over drug manufacturers, and set rules for drug advertisements and labels to ensure public health safety. The bill underwent the legislative process of being amended and debated in Congress until the Drug Amendments of 1962 was signed into law by President John F. Kennedy on October 10, 1962.

== Background ==
Senator Estes Kefauver first gained interest in this legislation and had background knowledge in the issues in the pharmaceutical industry because he once was a member on the U.S. Senate and Antitrust Subcommittee, where his role was to oversee companies to ensure they weren't taking advantage of their consumers, such as by overcharging them. During his time in the U.S. Senate and Antitrust Subcommittee, it was known that pharmaceutical companies were overpricing their drugs, produced false advertisements, and the drug industry didn't have enough regulations.

The amendment was a response to the thalidomide tragedy, in which thousands of children were born with birth defects as a result of their mothers taking thalidomide for morning sickness during pregnancy. The bill by U.S. senator Estes Kefauver, of Tennessee, and U.S. representative Oren Harris, of Arkansas, required drug manufacturers to provide proof of the effectiveness and safety of their drugs before approval. The majority of the tragic birth defects that occurred were in other countries because Thalidomide had not been approved for use in the United States by the FDA at the time the tragedy came to light. However, samples were distributed to physicians in the US, and 17 birth defects were attributed to its use. It is entirely possible that the drug would have been approved for use in the United States if not for the efforts of the FDA drug reviewer, Dr. Frances Kelsey, who used strategic red tape in existing legislation to hinder the approval process.

It introduced a "proof-of-efficacy" requirement for the first time. In addition, the Amendment required drug advertising to disclose accurate information about side effects and efficacy of treatments. Finally, cheap generic drugs could no longer be marketed as expensive drugs under new trade names as new "breakthrough" medications.

== Legislative History ==
Kefauver had been working for more than two years to get stronger drug regulations, but Congress had shown no interest. The major push for this legislation was the thalidomide tragedy, which major concern rose in mid-July of 1962.

These amendments were controversial where many opposed and support. For instance, some Senators opposed, such as Senator James O. Eastland because he believed that the amendments were restricting the drug industry and preventing drug manufacturers from helping Americans. Additionally, few doctors supported the amendments and hundreds of physicians had opposed the proposals of the amendments. Those who supported the bill included the public who was concerned about their safety and health, especially due to the thalidomide tragedy.

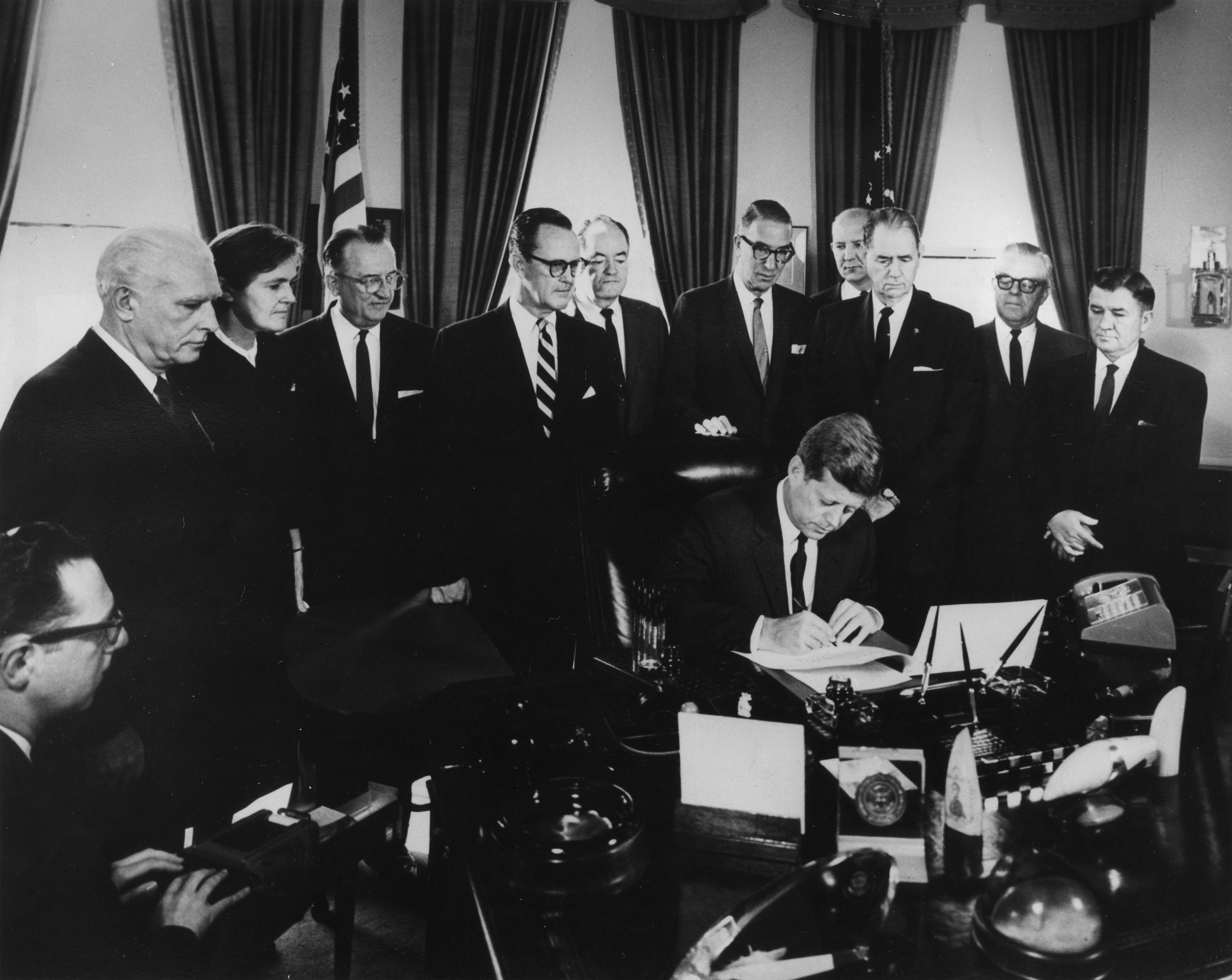
President John F. Kennedy signs the Drug Amendments of 1962 on October 10, 1962 at the Oval Office in the White House. Those present in observing President Kennedy include Senator Thomas J. Dodd (Connecticut), Dr. Frances Oldham Kelsey, George P. Larrick, Senator Philip A. Hart (Michigan); Senator Hubert H. Humphrey (Minnesota), Senator Kefauver; Ivan A. Nestingen, Senator Olin D. Johnston (South Carolina), Representative Leo W. O'Brien (New York), and Representative Kenneth A. Roberts (Alabama).

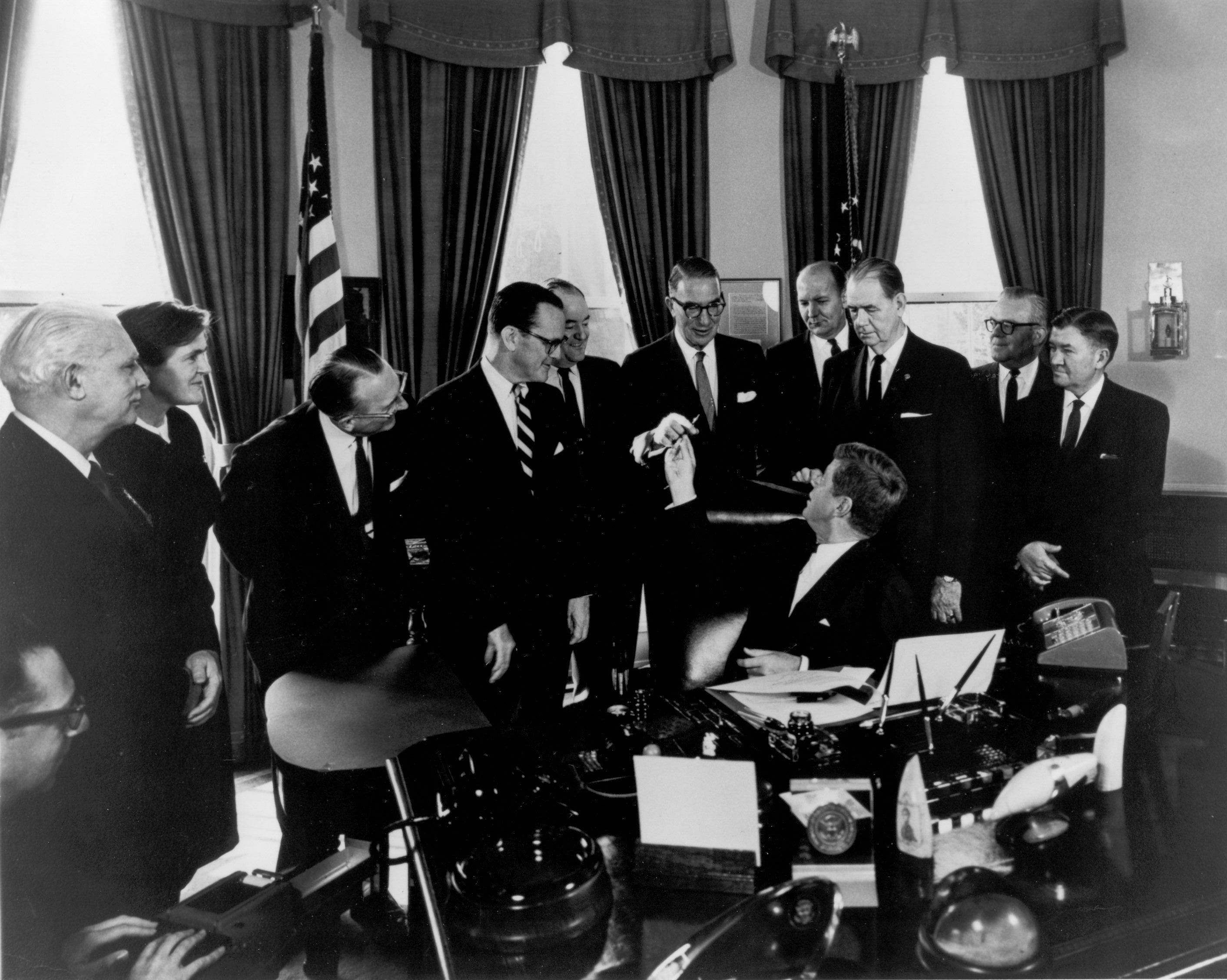
After President John F. Kennedy signs the Drug Amendments of 1962 on October 10, 1962, he hands the pen to Senator Estes Kefauver (Tennessee).

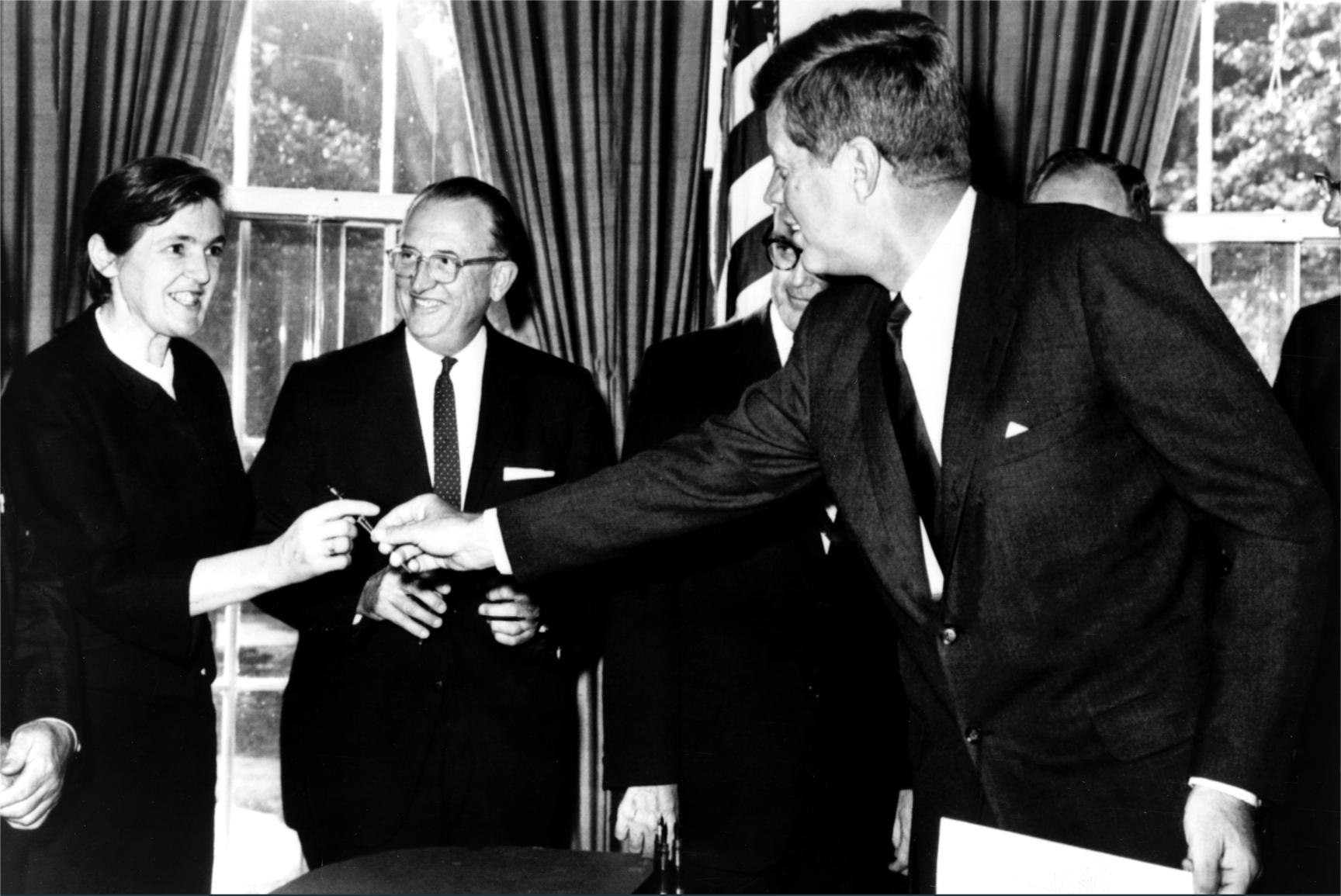
After President John F. Kennedy signs the Drug Amendments of 1962 on October 10, 1962, he hands a pen to those observing, like Dr. Frances O. Kelsey of the Food and Drug Administration (FDA) as shown in the image.

=== Legislative Timeline ===
The amendments were first introduced as 87 H.R. 1235 in the House on January 3, 1961.

It wasn't until August 22, 1962 when the amendments were debated in the Senate. On the following day, August 23, 1962, they were debated, amended, and passed in the Senate.

It was amended and passed in the House (in lieu of H.R. 11581) on September 27, 1962.

The Senate agreed to and had a Conference Report on October 3, 1962. The next day on October 4, 1962, the House agreed to a Conference Report.

The Drug Amendments of 1962 was signed into law by President John F. Kennedy on October 10, 1962.

== Provisions ==
The amendments introduced a requirement for drug manufacturers to provide proof of the effectiveness and safety of their drugs before approval, required drug advertising to disclose accurate information about side effects, and stopped cheap generic drugs being marketed as expensive drugs under new trade names as new "breakthrough" medications.

=== Drug Safety, Effectiveness, and Manufacturing ===
The amendments increased federal control over drug manufacturing processes by ensuring drugs were manufactured adequately, proven safe and effective, and monitored after being approved. In Section 101, it required drugs to be manufactured in sanitary conditions to prevent contamination and ensure safety.

Previously, legislation in the Federal Food, Drug, and Cosmetic Act required the drug industry to be safe. With the Drug Amendments of 1962, a major provision under Section 102 was that drugs had to be proven both safe and now effective before marketed for consumers. Drug manufacturers were also required to keep and submit records on their experiences with new drugs under Section 103. Along with these records, any adverse effects from the drugs needed to be reported to determine if the drug should remain on the market.

Additionally, antibiotics required batch-by-batch testing to ensure the quality and safety of drugs throughout every batch produced before being marketed or given to consumers.

=== Drug Labeling and Naming ===
To have consistent identification processes of drugs, the amendments provided new rules for naming drugs. Sections 111 and 112 established a system to review and designate official names for drugs and required that these standardized names be used on all drug labels. Both sections helped prevent any duplicate or inconsistent drug names across the pharmaceutical industry.

=== Drug Advertisements ===
Section 131 required drug advertisements to include any side effects and contradictions with other drugs along with the generic name of the drug that is at least half the size of the trade name to prevent companies from overpricing their drugs.

=== Factory Inspection ===
Federal government power expanded under these amendments by allowing the government to inspect drug factories. For instance, federal authority was allowed to conduct factory inspections of drug manufacturers to ensure they are meeting safety, quality, and manufacturing standards under Section 201. Factory inspections were required to happen at least once every two years, and the information needed for the inspections were all records related to prescription drugs.

=== Registering Drug Establishments ===
To have strong regulations over drug manufacturers, drug manufacturing establishments need to be registered, so the federal government is aware of them and could conduct inspections as needed. Sections 301 and 302 outline the purpose of requiring the registration of drug establishments, which is to help regulators monitor, inspect, and keep these establishments accountable.

== Effect ==
The Kefauver–Harris Amendment strengthened the U.S. Food and Drug Administration's control of experimentation on humans and changed the way new drugs are approved and regulated. Before the Thalidomide scandal in Europe, and Canada, U.S. drug companies only had to show their new products were safe. After the passage of the Amendment, an FDA New Drug Application (NDA) would have to show that a new drug was both safe and effective. Previously the 1938 Food, Drug and Cosmetic Act was the main law that regulated drug safety. Informed consent was required of patients participating in clinical trials, and adverse drug reactions were required to be reported to the FDA.

The Drug Efficacy Study Implementation was begun to classify all pre-1962 drugs that were already on the market as either effective, ineffective, or needing further study.

Louis Lasagna, then a prominent clinical pharmacologist at the Johns Hopkins School of Medicine, advised Congress about the proper conduct of clinical research during the 1962 hearings leading up to passage of the Amendment. These hearings prompted a recognition of good manufacturing practices as covering the quality of both the process and product, rather than solely the latter.

The law also exempted from the "Delaney clause" (a 1958 amendment to the Food, Drugs, and Cosmetic Act of 1938) certain animal drugs and animal feed additives shown to induce cancer, but which left no detectable levels of residue in the human food supply.

== See also ==
- Criticism of the Food and Drug Administration
- Directive 65/65/EEC1 (Europe)
- Drug Efficacy Study Implementation
- Durham-Humphrey Amendment
- Federal Food, Drug, and Cosmetic Act
- Frances Oldham Kelsey
- Regulation of therapeutic goods
