= Leslie Florence =

Scottish general practitioner

Alexander Leslie Florence, also called Leslie Florence (1927 – 26 March 2018) was a Scottish general practitioner, known for his letter on his observations of neurological side effects of thalidomide, published on 31 December 1960 in the British Medical Journal, and noticed by Frances Kelsey.

== Selected publications ==
- Florence, A. Leslie (31 December 1960). "Is Thalidomide to Blame?". British Medical Journal. 2 (5217): 1954. ISSN 0007-1447. PMC 2098660.
