= Thalidomide scandal =

Birth defects linked to thalidomide use

Phocomelia
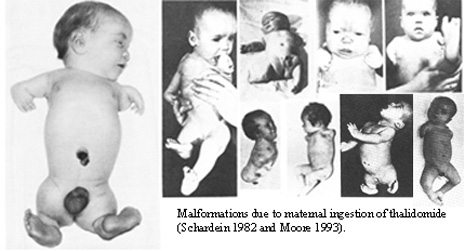
- Cases of severe thalidomide-induced phocomelia

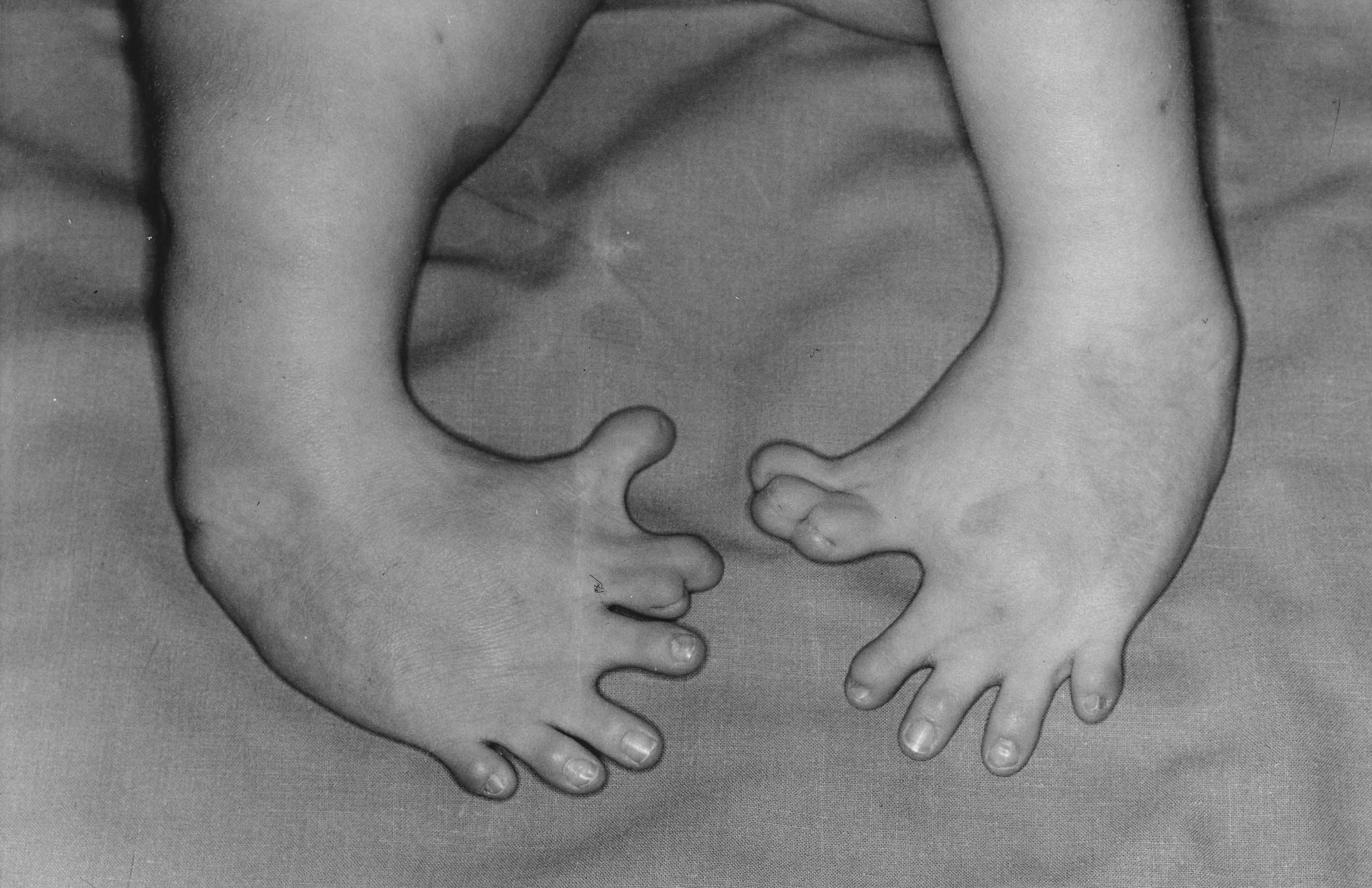
Feet of a baby born to a mother who had taken thalidomide while pregnant

In the late 1950s and early 1960s, thalidomide was prescribed to women in 46 countries who were pregnant or who subsequently became pregnant, and consequently resulted in the "biggest anthropogenic medical disaster ever," with more than 10,000 children born with a range of severe deformities, such as phocomelia, as well as thousands of miscarriages.

Thalidomide was introduced in 1957 as a tranquilizer, and was later marketed by the West German pharmaceutical company Chemie Grünenthal under the trade name Contergan as a medication for anxiety, trouble sleeping, tension, and morning sickness. It was introduced as a sedative and medication for morning sickness without having been tested on pregnant women. While initially deemed to be safe in pregnancy, the link between birth defects and thalidomide was presented in November 1961 by Widukind Lenz, and the medication was removed from the market in Europe before the end of the year.

== Development of thalidomide ==
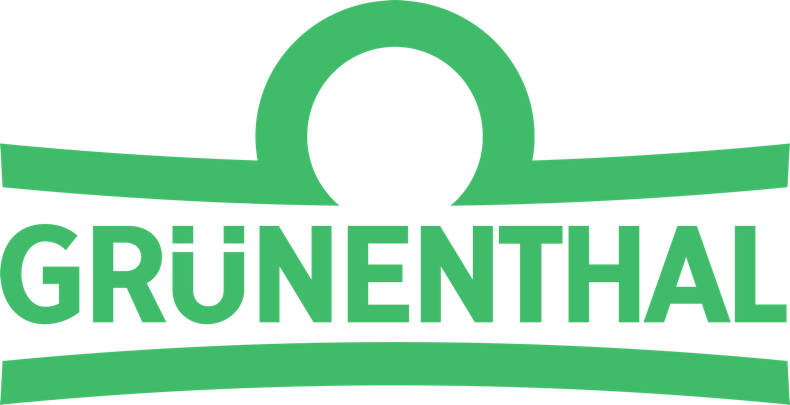

Thalidomide was first developed as a tranquilizer by Swiss pharmaceutical company Ciba in 1953. In 1954, Ciba abandoned the product, and it was acquired by German pharmaceutical company Chemie Grünenthal. The company had been established by Hermann Wirtz Sr, a Nazi Party member, after World War II as a subsidiary of the family's Mäurer & Wirtz company. The company's initial aim was to develop antibiotics for which there was an urgent market need.

== Mechanism of thalidomide in birth defects ==
Various receptor sites in the body are chiral. The R-isomer of thalidomide is an effective sedative but the S-isomer causes birth defects. The two isomers inter-convert at the pH of the body, such that even enantiomerically pure R-isomer will convert to the S-isomer.

== Birth defect crisis ==
The total number of babies affected by the use of thalidomide during pregnancy is estimated at more than 10,000, and potentially up to 20,000; of these, approximately 40 percent died at or shortly after the time of birth. Those who survived had limb, eye, urinary tract, and heart defects. Its initial entry into the U.S. market was prevented by Frances Oldham Kelsey at the U.S. Food and Drug Administration (FDA). The birth defects of thalidomide led to the development of greater drug regulation and monitoring in many countries.

The severity and location of the deformities depended on how many days into the pregnancy the mother was before beginning treatment; thalidomide taken on the 20th day of pregnancy caused central brain damage, day 21 would damage the eyes, day 22 the ears and face, day 24 the arms, and leg damage would occur if taken up to day 28. Thalidomide did not damage the fetus if taken after 42 days' gestation.

=== United Kingdom ===
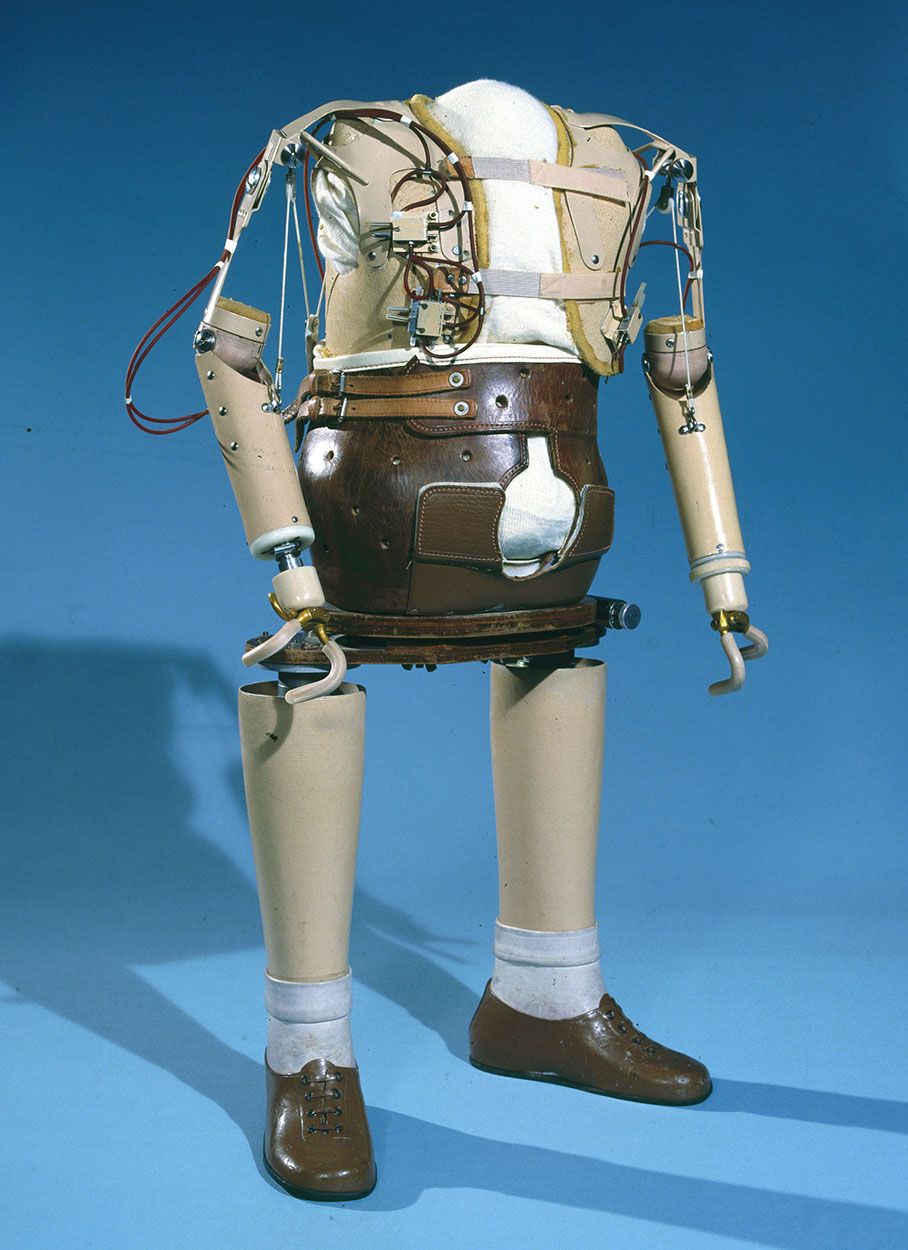
Artificial limbs made for an affected child in the 1960s by the Department of Health and Social Security's Limb Fitting Centre in Roehampton, London

In the UK, the drug was licensed in 1958 and withdrawn in 1961. Of the approximately 2,000 babies born with defects, around half died within a few months and 466 survived to at least 2010. In 1968, after a long campaign by The Sunday Times, a compensation settlement for the UK victims was reached with Distillers Company (now part of Diageo), which had distributed the drug in the UK. Distillers Biochemicals paid out approximately £28m in compensation following a legal battle.

The British Thalidomide Children's Trust was set up in 1973 as part of a £20 million legal settlement between Distillers Company and 429 children with thalidomide-related disabilities. In 1997, Diageo (formed by a merger between Grand Metropolitan and Guinness, who had taken over Distillers in 1990) made a long-term financial commitment to support the Thalidomide Trust and its beneficiaries. The UK government gave survivors a grant of £20 million, to be distributed through the Thalidomide Trust, in December 2009.

=== Spain ===
In Spain, thalidomide was widely available throughout the 1970s, and perhaps even into the 1980s. There were two reasons for this. First, state controls and safeguarding were poor; it was not until 2008 that the government even admitted the country had ever imported thalidomide. Second, Grünenthal failed to insist that its sister company in Madrid warn Spanish doctors, and permitted its sister company not to warn doctors of the defects. The Spanish advocacy group for victims of thalidomide estimates that in 2015, there were 250–300 living victims of thalidomide in Spain.

=== Australia and New Zealand ===
Australian obstetrician William McBride raised concern about thalidomide after a midwife named Sister Pat Sparrow first suspected the drug was causing birth defects in the babies of patients under McBride's care at Crown Street Women's Hospital in Sydney. German paediatrician Widukind Lenz, who also suspected the link, is credited with conducting the scientific research that proved thalidomide was causing birth defects in 1961. Further animal tests were conducted by George Somers, Chief Pharmacologist of Distillers Company in Britain, which showed fetal abnormalities in rabbits. Similar results were also published showing these effects in rats and other species.

Lynette Rowe, who was born without limbs, led an Australian class action lawsuit against the drug's manufacturer, Grünenthal, who fought to have the case heard in Germany. The Supreme Court of Victoria dismissed Grünenthal's application in 2012, and the case was heard in Australia. On 17 July 2012, Rowe was awarded an out-of-court settlement, believed to be in the millions of dollars and providing precedence for class action victims to receive further compensation. In February 2014, the Supreme Court of Victoria endorsed the settlement of $89 million AUD to 107 victims of the drug in Australia and New Zealand.

=== Germany ===
In East Germany, thalidomide was rejected by the Central Committee of Experts for the Drug Traffic in the GDR, and was never approved for use. Despite this, there were still between 12 and 80 known cases of thalidomide-children in the GDR, where the mothers had thalidomide smuggled into the GDR from West Germany. There, it took some time before the increase in dysmelia at the end of the 1950s was connected with thalidomide. In 1958, Karl Beck, a former pediatric doctor in Bayreuth, wrote an article in a local newspaper claiming a relationship between nuclear weapons testing and cases of dysmelia in children. Based on this, FDP leader Erich Mende requested an official statement from the federal government. For statistical reasons, the main data series used to research dysmelia cases started by chance at the same time as the approval date for thalidomide. After the Nazi regime with its Law for the Prevention of Hereditarily Diseased Offspring used mandatory statistical monitoring to murder disabled individuals, western Germany had been very reluctant to monitor congenital disorders in a similarly strict way. The parliamentary report rejected any relation with radioactivity and the abnormal increase of dysmelia. Also the DFG research project installed after the Mende request was not helpful. The project was led by pathologist Franz Büchner, who ran the project to propagate his teratological theory. Büchner saw lack of healthy nutrition and behavior of the mothers as being more important than genetic reasons. Furthermore, it took a while to appoint a Surgeon General in West Germany; the Federal Ministry of Health was not founded until 1962, some months after thalidomide was banned from the market. In West Germany approximately 2,500 children were born with birth defects from thalidomide.

=== Canada ===
Despite its severe side effects, thalidomide was sold in pharmacies in Canada until 1962. The effects of thalidomide increased fears regarding the safety of pharmaceutical drugs. The Society of Toxicology of Canada was formed after the effects of thalidomide were made public, focusing on toxicology as a discipline separate from pharmacology. The need for the testing and approval of the toxins in certain pharmaceutical drugs became more important after the disaster. The Society of Toxicology of Canada is responsible for the Conservation Environment Protection Act, focusing on researching the impact to human health of chemical substances. Thalidomide brought on changes in the way drugs are tested, what type of drugs are used during pregnancy, and increased the awareness of potential side effects of drugs.

According to Canadian news magazine programme W5, most, but not all, victims of thalidomide receive annual benefits as compensation from the Government of Canada. Excluded are those who cannot provide the documentation the government requires.

A group of 120 Canadian survivors formed the Thalidomide Victims Association of Canada, the goal of which is to prevent the approval of drugs that could be harmful to pregnant individuals and babies. The members from the thalidomide victims association were involved in the STEPS programme, which aimed to prevent teratogenicity.

=== United States ===
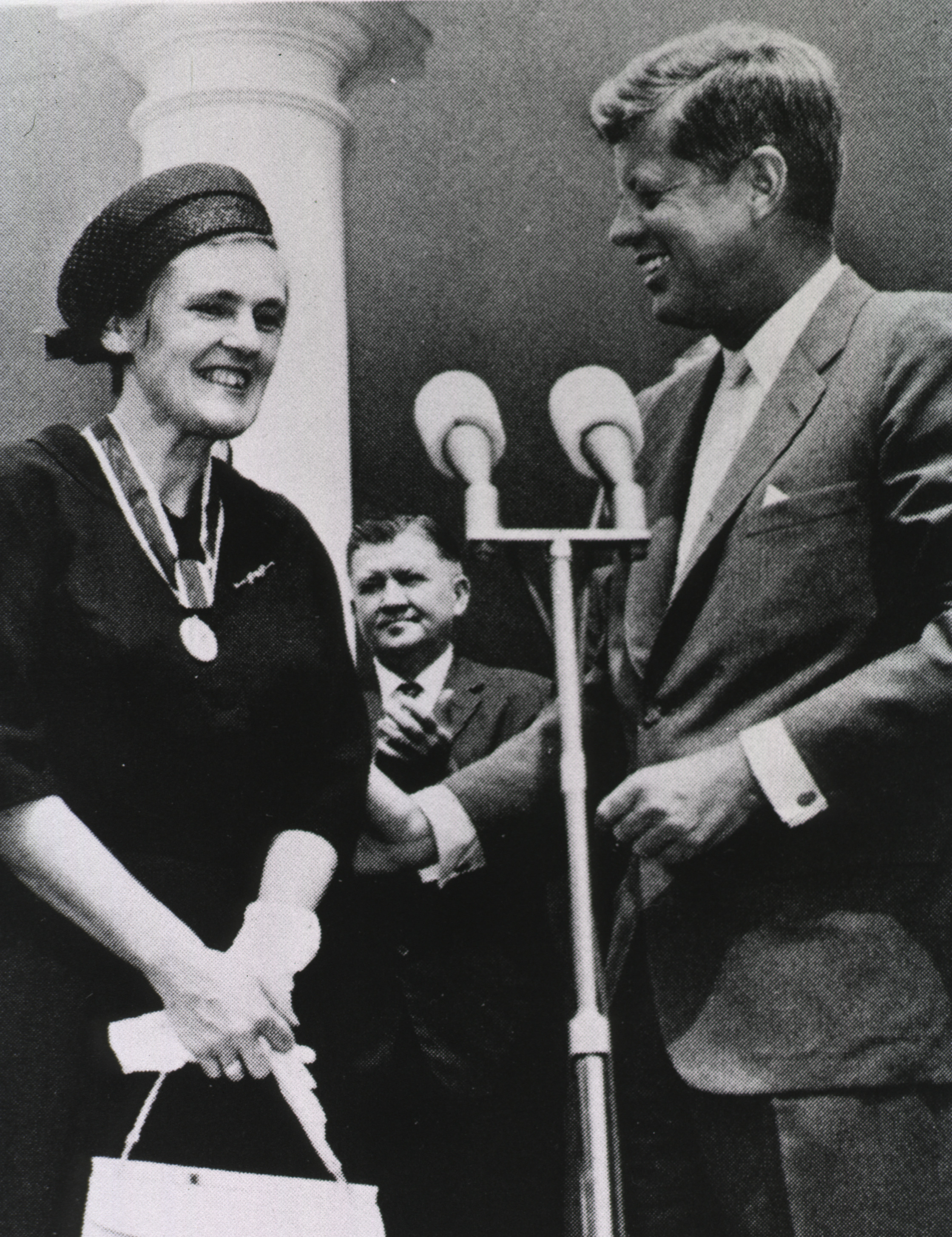
1962: FDA pharmacologist Frances Oldham Kelsey receives the President's Award for Distinguished Federal Civilian Service from President John F. Kennedy for blocking sale of thalidomide in the United States.

In the U.S., the FDA refused approval to market thalidomide, saying further studies were needed. This reduced the impact of thalidomide in American patients. The refusal was largely due to pharmacologist Frances Oldham Kelsey, who withstood pressure from the Richardson-Merrell Pharmaceuticals Co. Although thalidomide was not approved for sale in the United States at the time, over 2.5 million tablets had been distributed to over 1,000 physicians during a clinical testing program. It is estimated that nearly 20,000 patients, several hundred of whom were pregnant, were given the drug to help alleviate morning sickness or as a sedative, and at least 17 children were consequently born in the United States with thalidomide-associated deformities. Because the federal government did not try to track down all cases, focusing instead on documenting cases to support a criminal case, estimates of how many American babies were affected by thalidomide have varied. In 2011, about 50 Americans who believe they are thalidomide victims filed lawsuits to be compensated for their injuries, but the cases failed because the statute of limitations had expired. Americans who believe they are survivors formed a nonprofit, US Thalidomide Survivors.

While pregnant, children's television host Sherri Finkbine took thalidomide that her husband had purchased over-the-counter in Europe. When she learned that thalidomide was causing fetal deformities she wanted to abort her pregnancy, but the laws of Arizona allowed abortion only if the mother's life was in danger. Finkbine traveled to Sweden to have the abortion. Thalidomide was found to have deformed the baby.

For denying the application despite the pressure from Richardson-Merrell Pharmaceuticals Co., Kelsey eventually received the President's Award for Distinguished Federal Civilian Service at a 1962 ceremony with President John F. Kennedy. In September 2010, the FDA honored Kelsey with the first Kelsey award, given annually to an FDA staff member. This came 50 years after Kelsey, then a new medical officer at the agency, first reviewed the application from the William S. Merrell Pharmaceuticals Company of Cincinnati.

Cardiologist Helen B. Taussig learned of the damaging effects of the drug thalidomide on newborns and, in 1967, testified before Congress on the matter after a trip to Germany, where she worked with infants with phocomelia (severe limb deformities). As a result of her efforts, thalidomide was banned in the United States and Europe.

=== Austria ===
Ingeborg Eichler, a member of the Austrian pharmaceutical admission conference, enforced restrictions on the sale of thalidomide (tradename Softenon) under the rules of prescription medication and as a result relatively few affected children were born in Austria and Switzerland.

=== Japan ===
Approximately 300 survivors of thalidomide were thought to be living in Japan as of 2019. Survivors reported "higher levels of worry and stress, especially in terms of the future".

== Aftermath of scandal ==
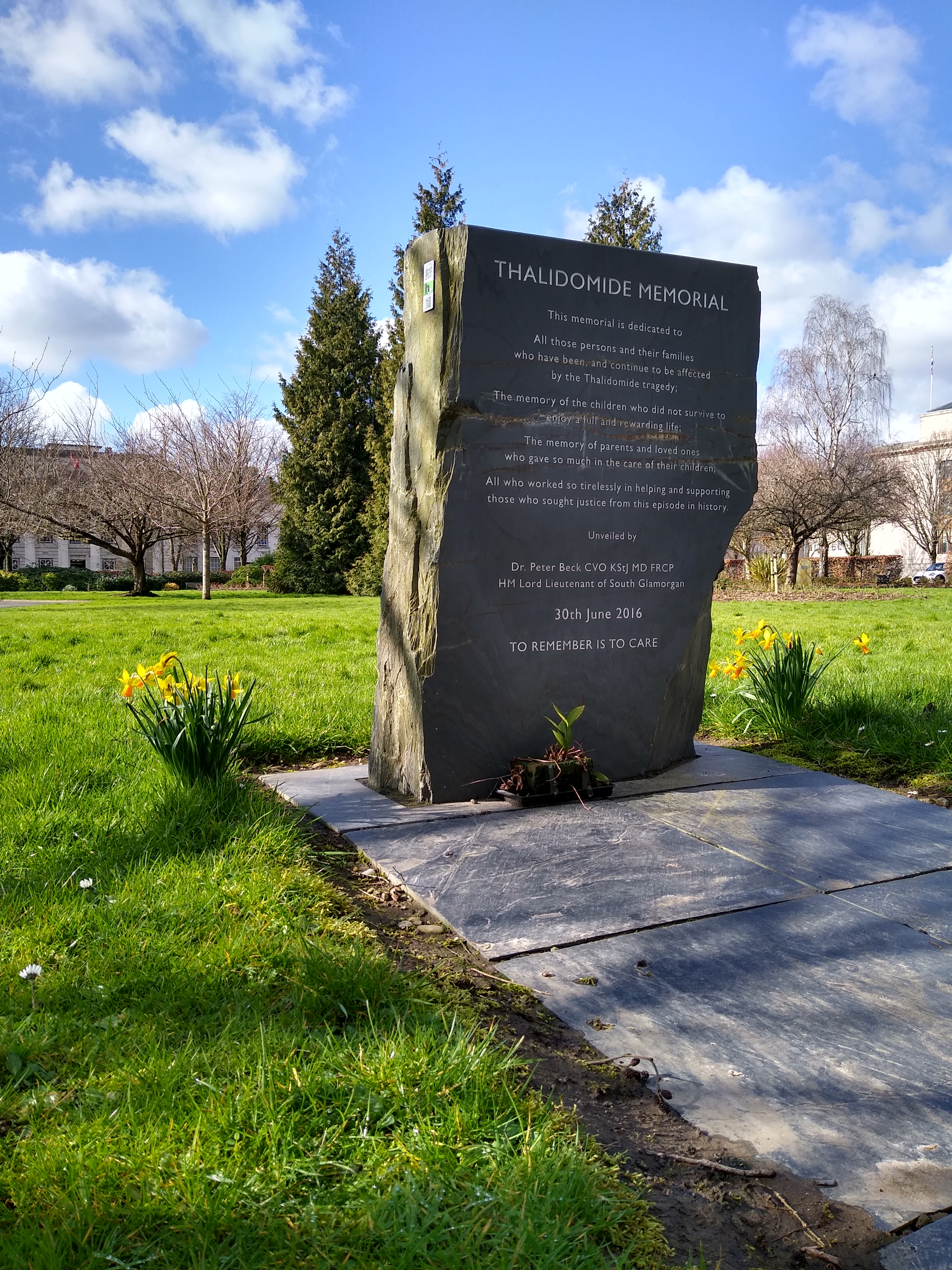
Thalidomide Memorial in Cardiff, Wales

The numerous reports of malformations in babies brought about the awareness of the side effects of the drug on pregnant women. The birth defects caused by the drug thalidomide can range from moderate malformation to more severe forms. Possible birth defects include phocomelia, dysmelia, amelia, bone hypoplasticity, and other congenital defects affecting the ear, heart, or internal organs. Franks et al. looked at how the drug affected newborn babies, the severity of their deformities, and reviewed the drug in its early years. Webb in 1963 also reviewed the history of the drug and the different forms of birth defects it had caused. "The most common form of birth defects from thalidomide is shortened limbs, with the arms being more frequently affected. This syndrome is the presence of deformities of the long bones of the limbs resulting in shortening and other abnormalities."

=== Grünenthal criminal trial ===
In 1968, a large criminal trial began in West Germany, charging several Grünenthal officials with negligent homicide and injury. After Grünenthal settled with the victims in April 1970, the trial ended in December 1970 with no finding of guilt. As part of the settlement, Grünenthal paid 100 million DM into a special foundation; the West German government added 320 million DM. The foundation paid victims a one-time sum of 2,500–25,000 DM (depending on severity of disability) and a monthly stipend of 100–450 DM. The monthly stipends have since been raised substantially and are now paid entirely by the government (as the foundation had run out of money). Grünenthal paid another €50 million into the foundation in 2008.

On 31 August 2012, Grünenthal chief executive Harald F. Stock— who served as the chief executive officer of Grünenthal GmbH from January 2009 to May 28, 2013— apologized for the first time for producing the drug and remaining silent about the birth defects. At a ceremony, Stock unveiled a statue of a disabled child to symbolize those harmed by thalidomide and apologized for not trying to reach out to victims for over 50 years. At the time of the apology, there were between 5,000 and 6,000 people still living with Thalidomide-related birth defects. Victim advocates called the apology "insulting" and "too little, too late", and criticized the company for not compensating victims and for their claim that no one could have known the harm the drug caused, arguing that there were plenty of red flags at the time.

=== Australian National Memorial ===
On 13 November 2023, the Australian Government announced its intention to make a formal apology to people affected by thalidomide with the unveiling of a national memorial site. Prime Minister Anthony Albanese described the thalidomide tragedy as a "dark chapter" in Australian history, and Health Minister Mark Butler said, "While we cannot change the past or end the physical suffering, I hope these important next steps of recognition and apology will help heal some of the emotional wounds."

== Change in drug regulations ==
The disaster prompted many countries to introduce tougher rules for the testing and licensing of drugs, such as the Kefauver Harris Amendment (US), Directive 65/65/EEC1 (E.U.), and the Medicines Act 1968 (UK). In the United States, the new regulations strengthened the FDA, among other ways, by requiring applicants to prove efficacy and to disclose all side effects encountered in testing. The FDA subsequently initiated the Drug Efficacy Study Implementation to reclassify drugs already on the market.

== See also ==
- South Korean humidifier disinfectant case – An outbreak of lung diseases in South Korea, caused by chemicals contained in dozens of humidifier disinfectants, resulting in officially recognized 1,814 deaths and 7,837 health damages, and estimates of up to 21,931 deaths, 1,020,000 health damages, and 9,630,000 exposures.
