= Frances Oldham Kelsey =

Canadian-American physician and pharmacologist (1914–2015)

Frances Oldham Kelsey CM
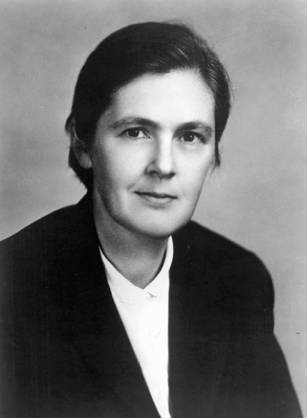
- Born: Frances Kathleen Oldham; July 24, 1914; Cobble Hill, British Columbia, Canada
- Died: August 7, 2015 (aged 101); London, Ontario, Canada
- Citizenship: Canada; United States (from the 1950s)
- Education: Victoria College, British Columbia; McGill University (BSc, MSc); University of Chicago (PhD, MD)
- Occupation: Pharmacologist
- Known for: Preventing thalidomide from being marketed in the United States
- Spouse: Fremont Ellis Kelsey (m. 1943; died 1966)
- Children: 2
- Medical career
- Field: Physician
- Awards: President's Award for Distinguished Federal Civilian Service (1962)

Frances Kathleen Oldham Kelsey CM (née Oldham; July 24, 1914 – August 7, 2015) was a Canadian-American pharmacologist and physician who had a 45-year career with the U.S. Food and Drug Administration (FDA). As a reviewer, she refused to authorize thalidomide for market because she had concerns about the lack of evidence regarding the drug's safety. Her concerns proved to be justified when it was shown that thalidomide caused serious birth defects. Kelsey's career intersected with the passage of laws strengthening FDA oversight of pharmaceuticals. Kelsey was the first woman to receive a PhD in pharmacology and the second woman to receive the President's Award for Distinguished Federal Civilian Service, awarded to her by John F. Kennedy in 1962.

== Early life and education ==
Born in Cobble Hill, British Columbia, Kelsey attended St. Margaret's School in Victoria, British Columbia, graduating at age 15. From 1930 to 1931, she attended Victoria College (now University of Victoria). She then enrolled at McGill University, where she received both a B.Sc. (1934) and an M.Sc. (1935) in pharmacology. Encouraged by one of her professors, she "wrote to EMK Geiling, M.D., a noted researcher [who] was starting up a new pharmacology department at the University of Chicago, asking for a position doing graduate work". Geiling, unaware of spelling conventions with respect to Francis and Frances, offered the position to her while addressing her as "Mr. Oldham". She accepted it while correcting the mistake by putting "miss" in brackets while writing the reply. She started work in 1936.

During Kelsey's second year, Geiling was retained by the FDA to research unusual deaths related to elixir sulfanilamide, a sulfonamide medicine. Kelsey assisted on this research project, which showed that the 107 deaths were caused by the use of diethylene glycol as a solvent. At that time, there was no law available to prosecute those who sold poison as medicine, and Kelsey observed the need to work around incomplete regulation. The next year, the United States Congress passed the Federal Food, Drug, and Cosmetic Act of 1938. That same year she completed her studies and received the University of Chicago's first Ph.D. in pharmacology. Working with Geiling led to her interest in teratogens, drugs that cause birth defects. She learned about the mechanism by which birth defects occur.

== Academic career ==
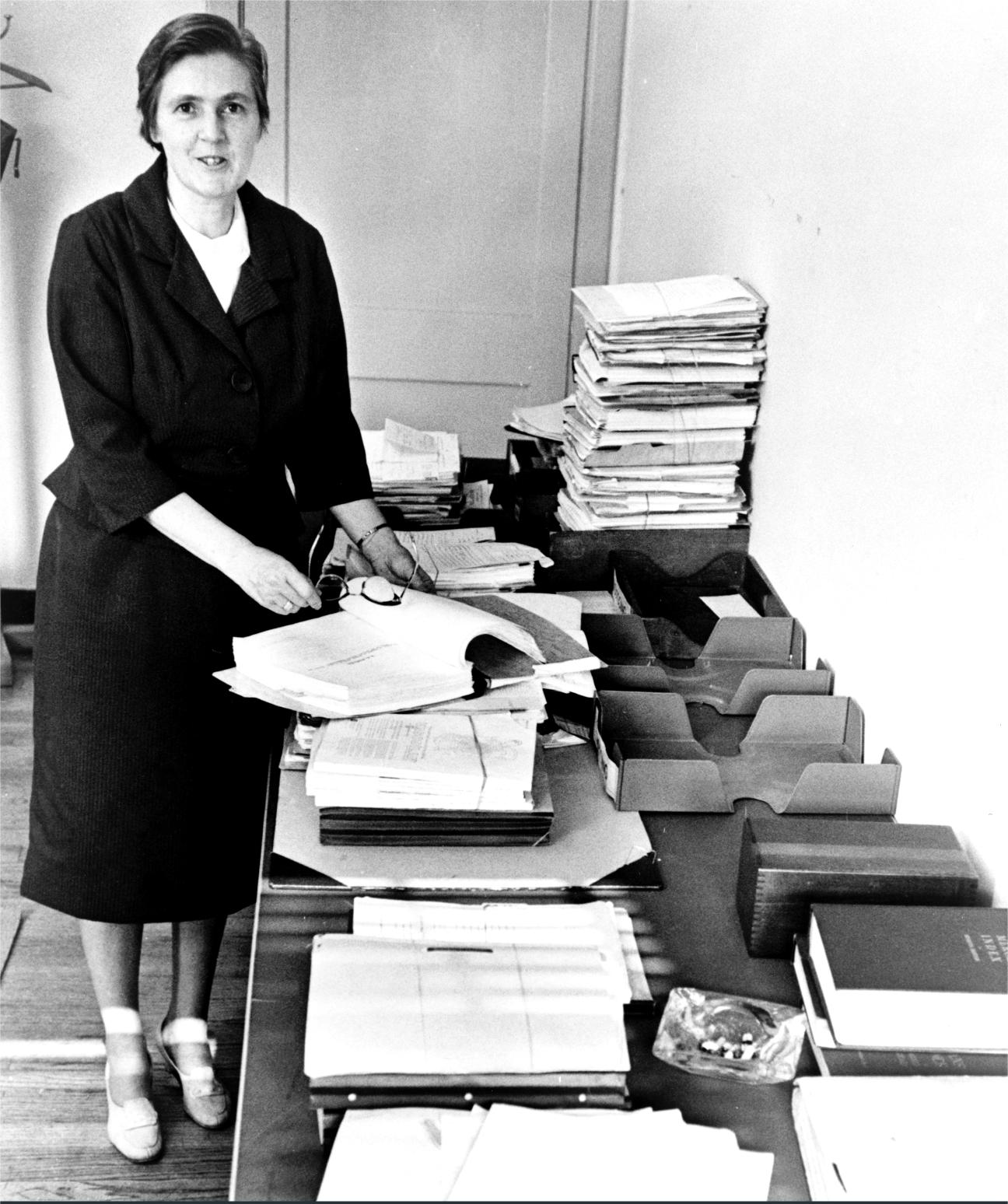
Kelsey in the 1960s

Upon completing her Ph.D., Oldham joined the University of Chicago faculty. In 1942, like many other pharmacologists, Oldham was looking for a synthetic cure for malaria. As a result of these studies, Oldham learned that some drugs are able to pass through the placental barrier. During her work, she also met fellow faculty member Fremont Ellis Kelsey, whom she married in 1943.

While on the faculty at the University of Chicago, Kelsey was awarded her M.D. in 1950. She supplemented her teaching with work as an editorial associate for the American Medical Association Journal for two years. Kelsey left the University of Chicago in 1954, decided to take a position teaching pharmacology at the University of South Dakota, and moved with her husband and two daughters to Vermillion, South Dakota, where she taught until 1957.

She became a dual citizen of Canada and the United States in the 1950s in order to continue practicing medicine in the U.S., but retained strong ties to Canada where she continued to visit her siblings regularly until late in life.

== FDA career ==
In 1960, Kelsey was hired by the FDA in Washington, D.C. At that time, she "was one of only seven full-time and four young part-time physicians reviewing drugs" for the FDA.

=== Work on thalidomide ===
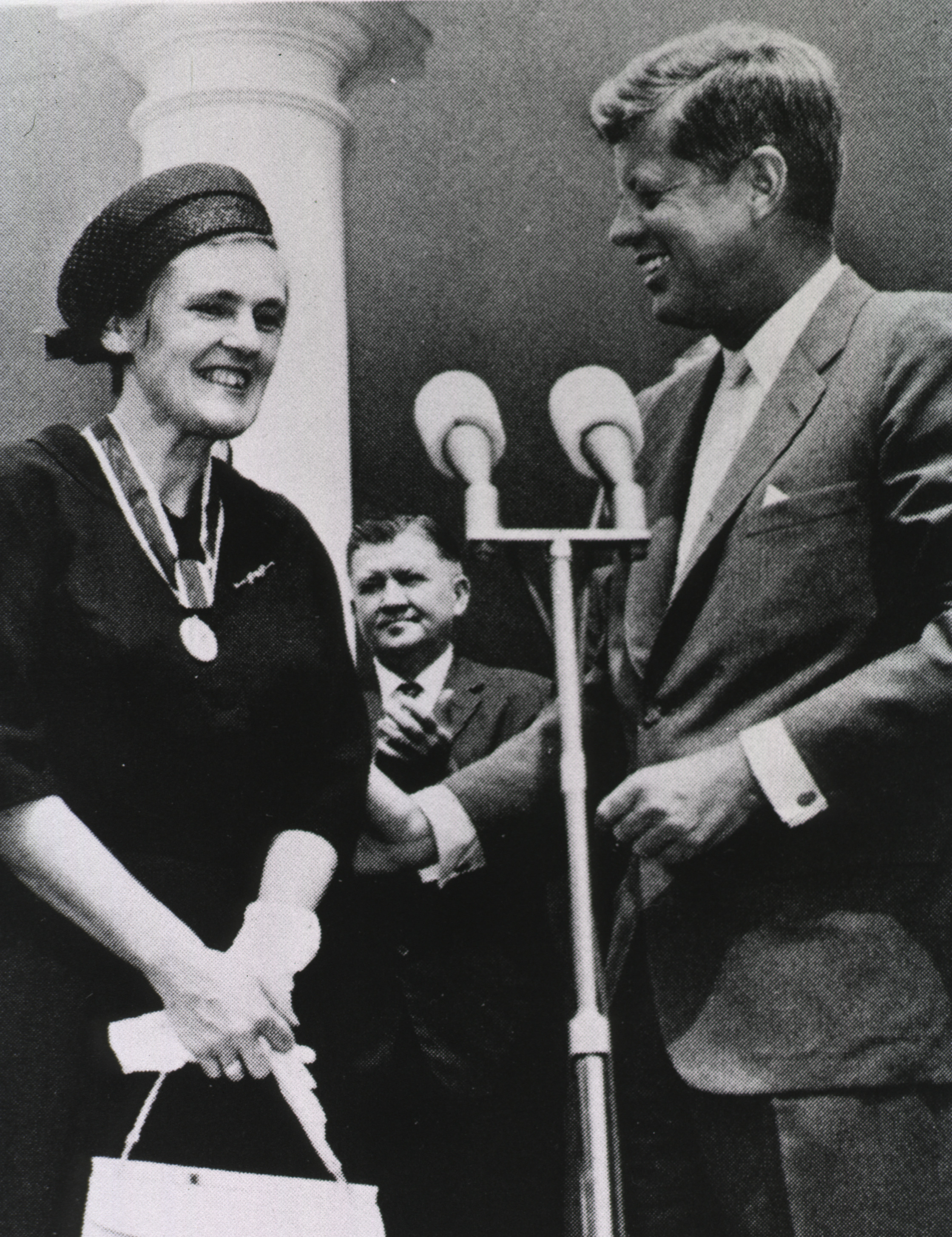
Kelsey received the President's Award for Distinguished Federal Civilian Service from President John F. Kennedy, 1962

One of her first assignments at the FDA was to review an application by Richardson-Merrell for the drug thalidomide (under the tradename Kevadon) as a tranquilizer and painkiller with specific indications to prescribe the drug to pregnant women for morning sickness. Although it had been previously approved in Canada and more than 20 European and African countries, she withheld approval for the drug and requested to see clinical trial information. At the time, the FDA could only withhold approval for 60 days at a time, so she continually requested further information from the company every 60 days for over a year. Her initial reason for doing this was that the testimonials supplied by Richardson-Merrell contained no scientific methodology, and she recognized their authors as having published suspicious articles in the past. Kelsey also observed that the application said nothing about the chirality of thalidomide.

In December 1960, Leslie Florence published a letter in the British Medical Journal connecting thalidomide to neurological symptoms. Kelsey saw this letter and added Florence's observed symptoms to her ongoing data requests. The unexpected neurological effects caused her to recall her earlier work on the mechanism of birth defects, so she also requested animal studies to demonstrate that the drug would not be harmful to the fetus. In fact, Richardson-Merrell had reportedly discovered birth defects when the drug was tested on rats but did not report this finding; Kelsey was instead sent misleading partial data suggesting the product was safe for pregnant women. Despite the fact that thalidomide was already widely used in Europe and elsewhere, Kelsey remained suspicious and scrutinized this data with concern and skepticism, sometimes asking her husband to check her conclusions. As 1960 turned to 1961, Kelsey's continual requests for more information incurred the ire of her contact at Richardson-Merrell, who insisted on speeding up the approval process and attempted to escalate the application, but Kelsey's superiors at the FDA stood by her.

Kelsey's insistence that the drug should be fully tested prior to approval was vindicated in November 1961 when the births of deformed infants in Europe were linked to thalidomide ingestion by their mothers during pregnancy. Researchers discovered that the thalidomide crossed the placental barrier and caused serious birth defects. In March 1962, after distributing "experimental" tablets to tens of thousands of patients without approval (with 17 malformed births confirmed and dozens more suspected), Richardson-Merrell at last withdrew their FDA application. Kelsey was hailed on the front page of The Washington Post as a heroine for averting a large-scale tragedy in the U.S. Morton Mintz, author of The Washington Post article, said "[Kelsey] prevented ... the birth of hundreds or indeed thousands of armless and legless children." Kelsey insisted that her assistants, Jiro Oyama (Note: The native form of this personal name is Oyama Jiro.) and Lee Geismar, as well as her FDA superiors who backed her strong stance, deserved credit as well. The narrative of Kelsey's persistence was used to help pass rigorous drug approval regulation in 1962.

After Mintz broke the story in July 1962, there was a substantial public outcry. The Kefauver Harris Amendment was passed unanimously by Congress in October 1962 to strengthen drug regulation. Companies were required to demonstrate the efficacy of new drugs, report adverse reactions to the FDA, and request consent from patients participating in clinical studies. The drug testing reforms required "stricter limits on the testing and distribution of new drugs" to avoid similar problems. The amendments, for the first time, also recognized that "effectiveness [should be] required to be established prior to marketing."

=== Later regulatory work ===
As a result of her blocking American approval of thalidomide, Kelsey was awarded the President's Award for Distinguished Federal Civilian Service by John F. Kennedy on August 7, 1962, becoming the second woman so honoured. After receiving the award, Kelsey continued her work at the FDA. There, she played a key role in shaping and enforcing the 1962 amendments. She was named Director of the Investigational Drug Branch.

In 1966, Lyndon B. Johnson appointed James L. Goddard as Commissioner of Food and Drugs. Goddard resented the public attention Kelsey continued to receive and believed widespread rumors spread by pharmaceutical industry executives that Kelsey had delayed the thalidomide application through pure laziness. This was precisely the opposite of the truth: most applications were automatically approved by reviewers ignoring the 60 day deadline, while Kelsey had carefully sent out data requests for over a year. Regardless, Kelsey was demoted from Director of the Investigational Drug Branch to Chief of the Division of Oncology and Radiopharmaceutical Drug Products, where she was given little work.

After Goddard's departure, Kelsey was again appointed Director of Scientific Investigations, and continued in this position for many decades. She was involved in the contentious regulation of diethylstilbestrol, which also caused birth defects, and dimethyl sulfoxide. In 1994, the Frances Kelsey Secondary School in Mill Bay, British Columbia, was named in her honour. She attended the opening ceremony despite having suffered broken ribs and a vertebral compression fracture on the way to the ceremony. In 1995, when she was 81, the FDA's Center for Drug Evaluation and Research created a special position for her, Deputy for Scientific and Medical Affairs in the Office of Compliance.

== Later life and death ==
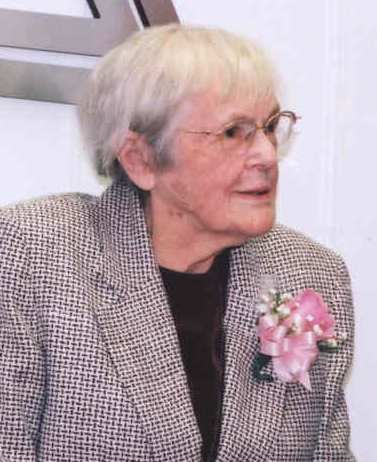
Kelsey (age 87) at the FDA reception commemorating her induction into the National Women's Hall of Fame

Kelsey retired from the FDA in 2005, at age 90, after 45 years of service. In 2010, the FDA presented Kelsey with the first Drug Safety Excellence Award and named the award after her, announcing that it would be given to one FDA staff member annually. In announcing the awards, Center Director Steven K. Galson said: "I am very pleased to have established the Dr. Frances O. Kelsey Drug Safety Excellence Award and to recognize the first recipients for their outstanding accomplishments in this important aspect of drug regulation."

Kelsey turned 100 in July 2014, and shortly thereafter, in the fall of 2014, she moved from Washington, D.C., to live with her daughter in London, Ontario. In June 2015, when she was named to the Order of Canada, Mercédes Benegbi, a thalidomide victim and the head of the Thalidomide Victims Association of Canada, praised Kelsey for showing strength and courage by refusing to bend to pressure from drug company officials, and said "To us, she was always our heroine, even if what she did was in another country."

Kelsey died in London, Ontario, on August 7, 2015, at the age of 101, less than 24 hours after Ontario's Lieutenant-Governor, Elizabeth Dowdeswell, visited her home to present her with the insignia of Member of the Order of Canada.

== Legacy ==
In 2024, Canadian historian Cheryl Krasnick Warsh published Frances Oldham Kelsey, the FDA, and the Battle against Thalidomide, a biography of Kelsey. Kelsey has been memorialized by the National Women's History Museum and the Science History Institute on their respective websites.

== Honors and awards ==
- 1962 – President's Award for Distinguished Federal Civilian Service
- 1963 – Gold Key Award from University of Chicago, Medical and Biological Sciences Alumni Association
- 1994 – Chosen as the namesake for Frances Kelsey Secondary School which opened in 1995.
- 2000 – Inducted into the National Women's Hall of Fame
- 2001 – Named a Virtual Mentor for the American Medical Association
- 2006 – Foremother Award from the National Center for Health Research
- 2010 – Recipient of the first Dr. Frances O. Kelsey Award for Excellence and Courage in Protecting Public Health given out by the FDA
- 2012 – Honorary doctor of science degree from Vancouver Island University
- 2015 – Named to the Order of Canada

== See also ==
- European Medicines Agency
- Thalidomide scandal
