= St. Margaret's School (Victoria, British Columbia) =

Location
- 1080 Lucas Avenue; Victoria, British Columbia, V8X 3P7; Canada; 48.4807°N 123.3640°W

Information
- School type: Independent Day & Boarding
- Motto: Servite in Caritate (Service with Love)
- Founded: 1908 (St. Margaret's School)
- Head of School: Sara Blair
- Grades: Preschool-12
- Enrollment: 353
- Language: English
- Colours: Red, Navy Blue, & White
- Mascot: Dudley the Panda
- Website: www.stmarg.ca

St. Margaret's School in Victoria, British Columbia, Canada, is an international, non-denominational independent day and boarding school for girls only, with grades ranging from Junior Kindergarten (Early Childhood Education, ECE) to Grade 12. It is located on 22 acres (89,000 m^{2}) of land and is the oldest, continuous independent school on Vancouver Island.

== St. Margaret's History ==
St. Margaret's School was founded in 1908 by two English sisters, Edith and Isobel Fenwick, joined soon by their friend Margaret Barton. The school started in a small house on the corner of Cook and Burdett Streets. It grew very quickly so that by 1911 another house on Cook Street was in use for the 80 students enrolled, and plans were underway for a new school and boarding house.

Tragedy struck on April 10, 1911, when the Fenwick sisters were drowned in the capsizing of the SS Iroquois as it left Sidney en route to Salt Spring Island. Margaret Barton, who was accompanying them, survived by clutching an oar, keeping herself afloat. For years after, she would describe her ordeal and show students her scarred hands, burned when she struggled to avoid a boiler.

Parents persuaded Miss Barton to take over the school as Headmistress once she had recovered. She accepted and took on the task of overseeing the construction of the new school in 1911–12 at 1654 Fort Street at Fern. Architect Karl Branwhite Spurgin designed the initial buildings and another, at 1824-48 Fern Street in 1926. Miss Barton served until 1928, followed by widow Mrs. Ann Paterson, who served from 1928 to 1934. In December 1928 Mrs. Paterson married architect K B Spurgin. Many changes and developments took place over the years and by 1928, SMS had amalgamated with St. George's, a rival Victoria girls' school. By the late 1960s, with aging buildings and the prospect of substantial repair, the Fort Street property was sold and the present property was purchased. In 1970 the new school opened at 1080 Lucas Avenue.

== School Motto ==
St. Margaret's school motto is Servite in Caritate which is Latin for Service with Love.
