= Drug Efficacy Study Implementation =

Drug Efficacy Study Implementation (DESI) was a program begun by the Food and Drug Administration (FDA) in the 1960s after the requirement (in the Kefauver-Harris Drug Control Act) that all drugs be efficacious as well as safe, was made part of US law. The DESI program was intended to classify all pre-1962 drugs that were already on the market as either effective, ineffective, or needing further study. The Drug Efficacy Study Implementation (DESI) evaluated over 3,000 separate products and over 16,000 therapeutic claims. By 1984, final action had been completed on 3,443 products; of these, 2,225 were found to be effective, 1,051 were found not effective, and 167 were pending.

One of the early effects of the DESI study was the development of the Abbreviated New Drug Application (ANDA).

== See also ==
- Estes Kefauver
- Federal Food, Drug, and Cosmetic Act
- Inverse benefit law
- Regulation of therapeutic goods
