= John Mendlein =

John Mendlein is a biotech executive who has held leadership positions in biotech companies in Boston, San Diego and Toronto.

Mendlein served as a board member, general counsel and chief knowledge officer at Aurora Biosciences Corporation (Nasdaq: ABSC), a company co-founded by Nobel laureate Roger Y. Tsien and since acquired by Vertex Pharmaceuticals (Nasdaq: VRTX) for more than $590 million.

He served as chairman and chief executive officer of Affinium Pharmaceuticals, Ltd., which was founded by Tak Wah Mak, Aled Edwards, Cheryl Arrowsmith and Jack Greenblatt and since acquired by Debiopharm Group for Phase 2 asset based on a novel antibiotic target.

Mendlein served as the CEO of Adnexus Therapeutics, a Boston, Massachusetts-based biotech company founded by Flagship Ventures and acquired by Bristol-Myers Squibb (NYSE: BMY) for over $500M in 2008. The technology platform was based on the work of Jack W. Szostak, 2009 Nobel Laureate for Physiology or Medicine. In 2017 by Bristol-Myers partnered one of the Adnexus programs to Roche, an anti-myotstatin program that has completed phase-2 testing in Duchenne patients.

After Adnexus, Mendlein helped found Fate Therapeutics (Nasdaq: FATE), a cell-based therapy company, in San Diego, and became its chairman.

He served on the board of directors of Monogram Biosciences, Inc., an HIV and oncology diagnostic company that was acquired by Laboratory Corporation of America Holdings in 2009.

He joined aTyr Pharma as executive chairman and later became CEO. aTyr was founded by Paul Schimmel and Xiang-Lei Yang. The company is focused on leveraging its broad intellectual property portfolio related to Physiocrines to develop protein therapeutics for the treatment of various rare diseases.

Mendlein is also a board member of Editas Medicine (Nasdaq: EDIT), Moderna Therapeutics and Axcella Health.

He is a founder and director of Homes for Sudan, a non-profit organization providing sustainable, fireproof homes for displaced families in Sudan. He also serves on the Biotechnology Innovation Organization (“BIO”) emerging-companies board and is a member of the scientific advisory board of the Ocean Discovery Institute.

Mendlein holds a Ph.D. in physiology and biophysics from the University of California, Los Angeles, a J.D. from the University of California, Hastings College of the Law, and a B.S. in biology from the University of Miami.
