= ReGenesis =

Canadian science fiction series

- Cover of Season 1 DVD. From left to right: Conrad Pla as Carlos Serrano, Mayko Nguyen as Mayko Tran, Peter Outerbridge as David Sandström, Maxim Roy as Caroline Morrison, Dmitry Chepovetsky as Bob Melnikov, and Sarah Strange as Jill Langston.
- Genre: Science fiction Biopunk; Medical drama Mystery; Thriller
- Created by: Christina Jennings
- Starring: Peter Outerbridge; Conrad Pla; Dmitry Chepovetsky; Wendy Crewson; Mayko Nguyen; Greg Bryk
- Opening theme: "Anywhere But Here"
- Country of origin: Canada
- Original language: English
- No. of seasons: 4
- No. of episodes: 52 (list of episodes)

Production
- Executive producers: Christina Jennings; Tom Chehak
- Production company: Shaftesbury Films

Original release
- Network: The Movie Network; Movie Central
- Release: October 24, 2004 – May 25, 2008

ReGenesis is a Canadian science-fiction television series produced by The Movie Network and Movie Central in conjunction with Shaftesbury Films. The series, which ran for four seasons from 2004 to 2008, revolves around the scientists of NorBAC (North American Biotechnology Advisory Commission), a fictional organization with a lab based in the city of Toronto. The organization investigates problems of a scientific nature, such as bioterrorism, mysterious diseases, or radical changes in the environment throughout North America. NorBAC is headed by David Sandström (played by Peter Outerbridge), the chief scientist, and molecular biologist. Through this character, the show often addresses topical social, political, and ethical issues related to the science at hand.

The series was originally broadcast on The Movie Network and Movie Central, with rebroadcasts on Global and Showcase in Canada. Internationally it can be seen on FX in the United Kingdom, The Science Channel, Halogen TV, and in syndication at CW Plus in the United States, and FX Latin America in Mexico; as well as numerous broadcasters in Europe and Asia. International distribution is handled by Oasis International. As of April 2012, the show can also be seen on Hulu. As of November 2018, ReGenesis is available on The Roku Channel.

Aled Edwards, the scientific consultant for the series, is a noted Canadian molecular biologist, and the director of the Structural Genomics Consortium.

== Interactive and other media ==
ReGenesis has been an international pioneer in integrating interactive media elements into the series. The first successfully deployed alternate reality game paired with a major television broadcast is called the ReGenesis Extended Reality and was created by Xenophile Media in association with Shaftesbury Films. It won the Canadian New Media Award for Best Cross-Platform Project of 2004 and an FITC Design & Technology Award for Excellence in Convergence. In 2006 the alternate reality game won the Banff World Television Festival Award for Interactive Television, a Gemini Award for Best Cross-Platform, and in 2007, an International Emmy for Outstanding Interactive Program. An exploratory game, the ReGenesis Extended Reality draws viewers into a conspiracy and mystery that weaves in and out of the TV series, using the internet, email, and other media to immerse the viewer, blurring the line between fiction and reality. ReGenesis Extended Reality harnesses the power of enthusiastic fans that seed the site with discussion content and collaborative investigations. Extensive knowledge of various chemistry and biotechnology issues is required to find out why the plot in many episodes can't be true (if it can't).

Other interactive elements include ReGenesis: ReMixed, a 14-episode series of podcasts hosted by series Music Supervisor Andrea Higgins and produced by Arpix Media, featuring the music of ReGenesis, as well as exclusive interviews with some of the people involved in putting the show together. However, neither of these was continued for the third or fourth season of the series.

== Characters ==
=== Main characters ===
- David Sandström (Peter Outerbridge) – A molecular biologist, he is NorBAC's chief scientist.
- Carlos Serrano (Conrad Pla) – Geneticist and Medical Doctor at NorBAC. Revealed to be gay after seeking to prevent his first lover's progression from HIV-positive status to AIDS (Season 1, Episode 7).
- Caroline Morrison (Maxim Roy) (seasons 1–2) – NorBAC's Executive Director. Speaks at least four languages: English, French, Spanish, and Mandarin Chinese.
- Jill Langston (Sarah Strange) (seasons 1–2) – first replacement to NorBAC's original lead virologist, Hira Khan.
- Bob Melnikov (Dmitry Chepovetsky) – Biochemist at NorBAC, and a former student of David Sandström. He is deemed a genius, with an IQ score of 162 (Season 1, Episode 5), and has attained two Ph.D.s (Season 1, Episode 11). He has been diagnosed with Asperger syndrome.
- Rachel Woods (Wendy Crewson) (seasons 3–4) – Second replacement as lead virologist at NorBAC and estranged wife of Carleton Riddlemeyer.
- Mayko Tran (Mayko Nguyen) – Canadian. Bioinformatics Researcher and later NorBAC's second replacement as executive director.
- Weston Field (Greg Bryk) – Assistant to NorBAC's executive director, Caroline Morrison. Later first replacement as executive director.
- Carleton Riddlemeyer (Geraint Wyn Davies) (seasons 3–4) – Science advisor to the White House and estranged husband of Rachel Woods.
- Enuka Okimba (Karen LeBlanc) (season 4) – Third replacement as lead virologist at NorBAC.

=== Recurring characters ===
- Hira Khan (Mishu Vellani) (season 1) – Original lead virologist at NorBAC.
- Lilith Sandström (Elliot Page (Note: Credited as Ellen Page)) (season 1) – David's 15-year-old daughter.
- Mick Sloane (Mark Rendall) (season 1) – A boy Lilith's age who believes he was cloned. He was created as part of an in vitro procedure and was an identical twin to Cal, whose single embryo was implanted in Dr. Sloane's wife. The twin embryo - Mick's - was frozen, and after it was discovered that Cal had bone cancer, Dr. Sloane began manipulating Mick's DNA to remove the defective gene that caused the cancer. In the process, he ended up making other, unintended changes, which is what led to Mick's illness. It is known that Mick is 2 years younger than Cal and that Mick was born 2 years after his mother died (which is part of what had led him to believe he was a clone in the first place), but it's unclear if the 2 events are directly related.
- Owen (Michael Seater) (seasons 2–3) – A homeless 17-year-old living in the subway of New York City, who shows David Sandström to his subway home after stealing David's bag. He lives with David for a while but leaves after he gets arrested for criminal negligence, after a 14-year-old girl he was involved with dies of a drug overdose. David defends him in court during his bail hearing, but Owen is incarcerated for detention until his trial. Having a hard time in jail, he tries to hang himself, and then he agrees to a treatment that should alter his brain chemistry in order to overcome his addiction and possibly get him free. However, he suffers from side effects of the experiment, leaving him mentally damaged and physically handicapped.
- Dr. Gordon Petras (James Allodi) – Therapist to whom the NorBAC team consults after traumatic events.
- Dr. Simon Jessup (Darren Boyd) – British neuroscientist visiting NorBAC. He assists Mayko with a case in Texas involving mad cow disease and IQ spikes, and later assists Caroline and Bob with Caroline's nephew Glenn.

== Music ==
The main title theme song for ReGenesis is "Anywhere But Here" by the Montreal band Behavior. Behavior is an alias for producer / composer Michael McCann. The show's score is primarily composed by Tom Third, with numerous contributions throughout by film/TV composer Robert Carli, and was supervised by Ron Proulx and Andrea Higgins of Arpix Media.

== Home releases ==
On November 11, 2008, Season 1 was released in North America on DVD by Entertainment One. The four-disc set includes all 13 first-season episodes presented in a letterboxed format. Special features include a making of, photo gallery, and "The Facts Behind the Fiction" (the white papers published by the Ontario Genomics Institute). Shaftesbury Films claimed that Seasons 2, 3 and 4 would follow throughout 2009 and 2010, but as of February 2013 no such releases have emerged.

The first season has also been released in the UK through Universal Studios UK. The second season was later released to European countries by Buena Vista Home Entertainment, though it was presented in a pan and scan format. Seasons 3 and 4 have been released on DVD in Japan—Season 3 in letterboxed format and Season 4 in 16:9 widescreen. The Japanese Season 3 boxset includes a 20-minute Making of video and the Season 4 boxset a 20-minute Peter Outerbridge interview titled "Pretending With Conviction".

On January 30, 2015, Season 1 was released in Europe on Blu-ray by Entertainment One. The three-disc set includes all 13 first-season episodes. Season 2 will be released on Blu-ray March 23, 2015.

In 2016, the full series was released in Germany by Just Bridge (renamed Just Entertainment after a subsequent merger). Its 16 DVDs are presented in a box set containing two gatefold digipaks, eight in the first (seasons 1 and 2) and eight in the second (seasons 3 and 4). The set also includes "Making Of" documentaries for seasons 1 and 3. Aspect ratio is 16:9 Video format is Region 2, PAL (requiring a region-free DVD player in the show's native North America). There are two German audio tracks, and one of the original English. The disk design for each season is based on the iconic "cast in a prism" logo, but color filtering and supporting cast changes distinguish the seasons from one another. The prolifically displayed year dates are those of the series copyrights; however, the release date of the Just Bridge DVD set can be found in tiny print on each digipak, when closed, on the bottom of its outside back panel. Now out of print, the Just Bridge set is periodically available via outlets such as eBay and Amazon Marketplace, etc. (This is a "hands on product" description. Reportedly, Just Bridge also released separate sets of Season 1 and 2.)

== International broadcasts ==
Country	TV Network(s)
Canada	The Movie Network, Movie Central (first run); Global (second run), Showcase, Vision TV
Argentina	Tecnopolis
France	Sci Fi Channel, 13ème Rue
France, Germany	Arte
Mexico	FX Latin America
Brazil	FX Latin America
Spain	Calle 13
Portugal	SIC Radical
United Kingdom	SciFi (UK) (first run) and FX (second run, premiering 22:00 on Wednesday, 22 October 2008).
Belgium	Canvas (Flanders), RTL TVi (Wallonia)
Korea	Science Channel
Japan	WOWOW
USA	Syndication, Halogen TV, MAVTV, Hulu, The Science Channel
Poland	AXN / AXN Sci-Fi
Russia	Russia 2
Italy	Mediaset Premium 1
Switzerland	RSI La 1
Bulgaria	Fox Crime, Vivacom Arena
Hungary	AXN
Romania	AXN and AXN Sci-Fi
Serbia	Fox Crime
Finland	YLE FST5
Philippines	Maxxx, Studio 23
South Africa	Mnet Action
Turkey	Dizi Smart, Dizi Smart Premium
Iran	سلامت
Albania	Vizion Plus
Australia	FX
