= Aled Edwards =

Canadian scientist

Aled Morgan Edwards FRS OC (born June 1, 1962) is the founder and Chief Executive of the Structural Genomics Consortium, a charitable public-private partnership. He is Professor of Medical Genetics and Medical Biophysics at the University of Toronto, Visiting Professor of Chemical Biology at the University of Oxford, and adjunct professor at McGill University.

== Early life ==
Born in Holyhead, Wales, Edwards moved to Canada in 1965 with his parents Undeg and Iwan Edwards, a choral conductor who was awarded the Order of Canada in 1995 for his contributions to Canadian music.

== Education ==
Edwards earned his bachelor's degree (1983) and his Ph.D. (1988) in biochemistry from McGill University supervised by Peter Braun. He carried out post-doctoral studies at Stanford University in the laboratory of Roger Kornberg, where he first crystallized RNA polymerase II, a structure for which Kornberg was awarded the Nobel Prize in Chemistry in 2006.

== Research contributions ==
From 1992 to 1997, while a professor at McMaster University, Edwards became interested in developing structural biology methods and was among the first to use mass spectrometry to identify regions of proteins prone to crystallization. He used this technique to facilitate the crystallography of key proteins involved in DNA replication and repair before becoming interested in applying this and other methods to carry out structural biology on a proteome scale.

In 1997, now at the University of Toronto, Edwards, together with his colleague Cheryl Arrowsmith, collaborated to launch one of the first projects in structural genomics, and soon published one of the papers that defined this new field. As a central player in the Protein Structure Initiative, their Toronto team contributed to more than a thousand new microbial protein structures over the next decade, developed new crystallization methods, and used structural methods to de-orphanize several nuclear receptors and study ion transport across membranes.

As of 2019, Edwards has co-contributed more datasets to the Protein Data Bank than any other scientist.

== Business activities ==
In the late 1990s, Edwards co-founded and served as CEO of Borealis Biosciences and Chalon Biotech, which he merged to form Affinium Pharmaceuticals, a Toronto-based company. Affinium developed afabicin, a novel narrow-spectrum antibiotic that is now in clinical development at DebioPharm. Several other companies have been spun out of his research programs, including Harbinger Biotechnology and Engineering, which was acquired by Epiphyte3, and 1DegreeBio, which was acquired by LabX Media Group.

More recently, Edwards founded M4K Pharma, a company that is developing a brain-penetrant drug targeting the ALK2 kinase, in order to treat children with incurable diffuse-intrinsic pontine glioma (DIPG). The novel open science business model being developed by M4K Pharma allows its science to be disclosed on an ongoing basis, and for any approved drug to be priced affordably. Edwards serves on the Board of the Agora Open Science Trust.

== Open science and science policy ==
=== Open Science ===
Edwards is considered one of the pioneers of open science, particularly as it applied to biomedicine and drug discovery. Since 2003, all human protein structural information derived from the SGC has been placed into the public domain, prior to publication and without restriction on use. In 2007, he, together with Richard Gold, created the SGC Open Science Principles, under which the SGC became the first biomedical research organization to adopt open science principles that mandated sharing and eschewed patenting on any activity, including novel chemistry. In 2016, Edwards both spearheaded the Open Lab Notebook initiative, which now comprises over 20 scientists sharing their experiments as they are done, as well as collaborated with Guy Rouleau at the Montreal Neurological Institute (The Neuro) to create the concept of an open research institute. That collaboration led to the formation of the Tanenbaum Open Science Institute, and to the broader institutional commitment of The Neuro to open science. In 2017, Edwards and colleagues conceptualized an open trust mechanism to share research reagents, and the SGC has been using this mechanism since. Edwards also helped launch YCharOS Inc. (/ˈɪkərəs/), an open science antibody characterization agency. In 2018, Edwards, Max Morgan and Owen Roberts launched the world's first open science drug discovery company, M4K (Meds for Kids) Pharma, and developed a business model that is consistent with open science and affordable pricing. In 2019, Morgan and Edwards launched M4ND Pharma, to tackle neurological diseases using open drug discovery approaches. For his leadership role in promoting open access drug discovery, Edwards was named a Senior Ashoka Fellow in 2015.

=== Science and innovation policy ===
On the 10th anniversary of the publication of the draft sequence of the human genome, Edwards and colleagues were asked for their perspective. Their "Roads not Taken" paper, which quantified the "under-studied" parts of the human genome, has led to a number of funding initiatives, including the Illuminating the Druggable Genome initiative at the NIH, and presaged a number of studies that examine the unintended consequences of the peer-review system.

Edwards is a champion of science reproducibility, focusing considerable attention on the quality of research reagents and the need for transparent standards.

Edwards has also contributed to science communication; he served as the scientific advisor for the Gemini Award-winning television series ReGenesis.

=== Awards ===
Dr Edwards was recently named as an Officer of the Order of Canada for "advancing Canada's global reputation as a leader in open science research by founding the groundbreaking Structural Genomics Consortium." He was elected a Fellow of the Royal Society in 2024.

== Personal ==
Edwards has been married to Elizabeth Edwards since 1985, and they have three children and five grandchildren. Elizabeth is director of BioZone and Professor of Chemical Engineering and Applied Chemistry at the University of Toronto, an Officer of the Order of Canada, and winner of Canada's 2016 Killam Prize for Engineering, among other awards. She is the daughter of Leonhard and Jeanne Wolfe, who was awarded the Order of Canada in 2009 for her contributions to Canadian planning. Aled's brother, Owain Edwards, is an entomologist at CSIRO in Australia.
