= Target 2035 =

Target 2035 is a global effort or movement to discover open science, pharmacological modulator(s) for every protein in the human proteome by the year 2035. The effort is led by the Structural Genomics Consortium with the intention that this movement evolves organically. Target 2035 has been borne out of the success that chemical probes have had in elevating or de-prioritizing the therapeutic potential of protein targets. The availability of open access pharmacological tools is a largely unmet aspect of drug discovery especially for the dark proteome.

The first five years will include building mechanisms (Phase 1 below) which allow researchers to find collaborators with like-minded goals towards discovering a pharmacological tool for a specific protein or protein family, and make it open access (without encumbrances due to intellectual property). One strategic goal is seeding new open science programs on components of the drug discovery pipeline with the goal to bring medicines to the bedside equitably, affordably and rapidly. Phase 1 will also build a framework that welcomes new and (re-)emerging enabling technologies in hit-finding and characterization. An update on the progress was published.

Target 2035 will draw on successes from past and current publicly-funded programs including National Institutes of Health (NIH) Illuminating the Druggable Genome initiative for under-explored kinases, GPCR’s and ion channels, Innovative Medicines Initiative's RESOLUTE project on human SLCs, Innovative Medicines Initiative's Enabling and Unlocking Biology in the Open (EUbOPEN), and Innovative Medicines Initiative's Unrestricted Leveraging of Targets for Research Advancement and Drug Discovery. The NIH recently re-iterated their commitment to making their data open to mitigate the tens of billions due to irreproducible data.

Target 2035 will collaborate with the Chemical Probes Portal and open science platforms, e.g. Just One Giant Lab, in order to spread awareness and education of best practices for chemical modulators and the benefits of open science, respectively.

The following draft plan has been outlined in a white paper.

== Phase 1 ==
The first phase, from 2020 to 2025, would be structured to build the foundation for a concerted global effort, and would aim to collect, characterize and make available existing pharmacological modulators for key representatives from all proteins families in the current druggable genome (~4,000 proteins), as well as to develop critical and centralized infrastructure to facilitate data collection, curation, dissemination, and mining that will power the scientific community worldwide. This phase might also create centralized facilities to provide quantitative genome-scale biochemical and cell-based profiling assays to the federated community, as well as to coordinate the development of new technologies to extend the definition of druggability. This first phase will complement and extend ongoing efforts to create chemical tools and chemogenomic libraries to blanket priority gene families, such as kinases and epigenetics families.

One year into Target 2035 has so far yielded infrastructure to house data on chemogenomic compounds reported in the literature. A progress update was published recently. Towards the development of new technologies, Target 2035 started a new initiative Critical Assessment of Computational Hit-Finding Experiments (CACHE) aimed at benchmarking computational methods for hit-finding. The first competition - finding ligands for the WD40 domain of LRRK2 - started in March 2022. The first round of predictions have been submitted. In the meantime, applications for the second CACHE benchmarking - predicting ligands for the RNA-binding domain for Nsp13 - has been posted.

== Phase 2 ==
The second phase, from 2025 to 2035, will be to apply the new technologies and infrastructure to generate a complete set of pharmacological modulators for > 90% of the ~20,000 proteins encoded by the genome. “Target 2035” sounds ambitious, but its concept and practicality is on firm ground based on a number of pilot studies, which revealed the following success parameters:

- Collaborate with the pharmaceutical sector to access unparalleled expertise, experience, materials, and logistics
- Establish clear and quantitative quality criteria for the output (target chemical tool profiles) to provide focus
- Organize the project around protein families – it is the most efficient, practical and scientifically sound way to divide this large project into teams
- Establish clear open science principles to eliminate or reduce conflicts of interest, to reduce legal encumbrances, and to encourage participation by the community.
