= ATyr Pharma =

American biotherapeutics company

aTyr Pharma, Inc.
- Type: Public
- Traded as: Nasdaq: ATYR; Russell Microcap Index component
- Industry: Biotechnology; Pharmaceutical
- Founded: 2005; 21 years ago
- Founder: Paul Schimmel; Xiang-Lei Yang
- Headquarters: San Diego, California, United States
- Key people: Sanjay S Shukla (CEO & President)
- Number of employees: 55
- Website: atyrpharma.com

aTyr Pharma is a public biotherapeutics company (Nasdaq: LIFE) that is focused on researching the extracellular functionality and signaling pathways of tRNA synthetases.

The company's lead product candidate, ATYR1923, is a selective modulator of Neuropilin-2 (NRP2) that downregulates both the innate and adaptive immune responses in inflammatory disease states. aTyr is developing ATYR1923 as a potential disease-modifying therapy for patients with interstitial lung disease (ILD), a group of rare immune-mediated disorders that cause progressive fibrosis of the lung interstitium and remain a high unmet medical need. ATYR1923 is currently being investigated in a clinical trial in pulmonary sarcoidosis patients.

The company was founded in 2005 and is headquartered in San Diego, California, and led by CEO Sanjay S. Shukla.

== History ==
In 2005, aTyr was founded by Paul Schimmel, and Xiang-Lei Yang, two aminoacyl tRNA synthetase scientists at The Scripps Research Institute. In 2009, Bruce Beutler, recipient of the 2011 Nobel Prize in Physiology or Medicine, joined aTyr as a member of the scientific advisory board.

In April 2007, Polaris Partners and Alta Partners co-led a $10.5 million Series B financing. In October 2010, Series C financing totaled $23 million and was led by Domain Associates. This round was followed by a $49 million Series D in August 2013.

aTyr was a winner of the 2011 Red Herring 100 North America Award for discovering and developing innovative medicines based on Physiocrine biology.

In April 2015, aTyr raised $76 million in a Series E, led by Sofinnova Ventures, and filed for an IPO. The company began trading as LIFE on the Nasdaq stock exchange.

ATyr's primary focus is on ATYR1923, a clinical stage product candidate which binds to the NRP2 receptor and is designed to down regulate immune engagement in interstitial lung diseases (ILDs). ATYR1923 is currently being investigated in a clinical trial in patients with pulmonary sarcoidosis. In January 2020, ATyr entered into a license with Kyorin Pharmaceutical Co., Ltd. for the development and commercialization of ATYR1923 for ILDs in Japan. Under the license agreement, Kyorin received an exclusive right to develop and commercialize ATYR1923 in Japan for all forms of ILDs including, sarcoidosis, chronic hypersensitivity pneumonitis (CHP) and connective tissue disease ILD (CTD-ILD). aTyr recently initiated a clinical trial for ATYR1923 in patients with severe respiratory complications related to COVID-19.

== Therapeutic concept ==
Homeostasis, or the coordinated regulation of tissues within the body, is fundamental to the maintenance of the overall health of an organism. Lack of homeostasis can lead to disease and death. The process of homeostasis was first described in 1865 by the French physiologist Claude Bernard and Walter Cannon later coined the term. In the 150 years since this discovery, many proteins associated with homeostatic pathways have been discovered, ranging from insulin to erythropoietin.

aTyr was founded after Dr. Schimmel discovered several nontranslational functions of aminoacyl tRNA synthetases, which are primarily responsible for the production of a vital component of protein synthesis, aminoacyl-tRNAs. [23] These nontranslational functions have since been shown to play an important role in maintaining homeostasis. [23] One of these nontranslational functions is modulation and regulation of the immune response. [23] This modulatory activity is a result of Physiocrines, a novel class of proteins that are present as biologically active signaling regions of the tRNA synthetases. aTyr's research is based on the premise that Physiocrines are involved in orchestrating homeostatic activities to help the body restore diseased or damaged tissue to a healthier state.

By researching and understanding the role of Physiocrines in immune modulation, aTyr has developed two IND candidates.
