= Notes Left Behind =

2009 book by Keith and Brooke Desserich

- The cover of Notes Left Behind
- Author: Keith and Brooke Desserich
- Language: English
- Genre: Non-fiction
- Publisher: HarperCollins
- Publication date: 2009
- Publication place: United States
- Pages: 272
- ISBN: 978-0-06-188639-3

Notes Left Behind is a 2009 non-fiction book by Keith and Brooke Desserich, the parents of a six-year-old girl named Elena who died of cancer. The book is a publication of some of the hundreds of notes Elena left for her parents to find after her death. It follows Elena's battle against brain cancer.

== Background ==
Elena Desserich, from the Cincinnati suburb of Wyoming, Ohio, United States, was diagnosed with an inoperable form of brain cancer called diffuse intrinsic pontine glioma (DIPG) in 2006 and her parents were told she had just 135 days to live. Her parents vowed to make what remained of Elena's life as special as possible. She lived for 10 months after her diagnosis, eventually left paralysed and unable to speak by the cancer. She died in August 2007. Shortly after, her parents and younger sister, Grace Desserich, began finding notes all over the house. Her parents did not tell Elena her prognosis, but retrospectively believe that she knew it.

== Narrative ==
After her diagnosis at the age of five, Elena Desserich wrote hundreds of "love messages" to her parents, Keith and Brooke Desserich, who published the notes in Notes Left Behind in 2009. She hid the messages at various places in their house so that her parents would find them after her death. Elena, who turned 6 in the nine months between her diagnosis and her death, died in August 2007 and her parents published the book in November 2009. The book also contains entries from Elena's parents' diary as well as several of Elena's drawings.

Her parents said that they found the first of the notes several days after Elena's death, but "then they kept on showing up everywhere and now we have three large boxes full of them".

== Impact ==
Originally self-published in 2009, it soon received national attention and was later re-published in 2009 by HarperCollins Publishers. It was listed as a New York Times Best Seller shortly thereafter. Ultimately the book was republished in over 22 foreign language versions.

One of Elena's paintings, which she titled I love You, was displayed at the Cincinnati Art Museum next to a work by Pablo Picasso, one of Elena's lifelong ambitions which she had recorded on her wish list during her illness.

The authors, Brooke and Keith Desserich, live in Cincinnati, Ohio, and founded the Cure Starts Now Foundation, an organization dedicated to researching a cure for all cancers, starting first with pediatric brain cancer. A percentage of the funds raised from the sale of Notes Left Behind goes towards the Cure Starts Now Foundation.

Subsequent to the publishing of Notes Left Behind, Grace Desserich also published the children's book, Rita the Boot-Necked Girl, drawing from stories that she and her sister Elena exchanged before Elena's passing. The story tells the fictional tale of five friends and the lessons they learn regarding bullying.
