= Chemical Probes Portal =

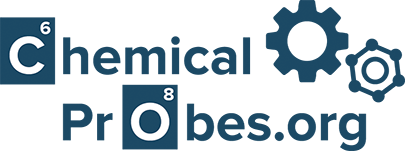
- Formation: 2015; 11 years ago
- Type: Scientific society
- Legal status: 501(c)(3) nonprofit organization
- Purpose: Increasing the quality and reproducibility of biomedical research using chemical probes.
- Headquarters: Sutton, London
- Location: UK
- Board of Governors: Milka Kostic, Alessio Ciulli, Akane Kawamura, Laetitia Martin, Osamu Nakanishi, Jonathan S. Rosenblum, Maria Laura Bolognesi, Nir London
- Key people: Paul Workman, Aled Edwards, Bissan Al-Lazikani, Susanne Müller-Knapp, Paul Brennan, Benjamin Bellenie, Albert A. Antolin, Domenico Sanfelice, Alisa Crisp
- Website: www.chemicalprobes.org

The Chemical Probes Portal is an open, online resource whose purpose is to identify and make available high quality chemical probes for use in biological research and drug discovery. While chemical probes can be valuable tools to elucidate signal transduction pathways and to validate new drug targets, many of the probes that are in use are not selective and therefore can give very misleading results.

The Portal recommends chemical probes based on ratings provided by its Scientific Expert Review Panel (SERP), a group of experts in the fields of chemical biology, medicinal chemistry, and pharmacology, who (1) determine which are the best chemical probes available and (2) establish guidelines for using them.

== History ==
After years of publishing best practice guidelines for the selection and use of chemical probes. many in the field agreed that publications were insufficient to disseminate this type of information. In July 2015, these experts, led by the Structural Genomics Consortium (SGC), collaborated to publish an overview of the misuse of chemical probes and the impact that misuse has on the reliability of research. A prototype website was launched by the SGC in conjunction with the publication.

This publication and the Portal were launched at the same time the biomedical research community was becoming aware of problems in the reproducibility of much of the scientific literature. According to an economic impact study, $28 billion per year is spent on irreproducible biomedical research in the US alone. The most common reasons that studies prove irreproducible include problems with the selection of reagents and reference materials (36%), study design (28%), data analysis and reporting (25%), and laboratory protocols (11%). Errors in the selection and application of chemical probes can contribute to waste in each of these categories. Given the context and the need, the prototype Portal was largely well received by the scientific community, although it was noted that the prototype Portal was launched with a very small number (seven to be exact) of probes.

In 2016, the SGC recruited staff to take over the Portal, establish it as an independent organization, and build it into a reputable source for information about chemical probes. This new organization was supported with funds provided by the Wellcome Trust and the SGC. By the end of the first quarter, the Portal's new leadership incorporated the organization in North Carolina, US, established a board of directors and developed a plan to grow the Portal through a community-driven, expert-curation process. The Portal was re-launched on June 30, 2016 with this operations plan integrated into the site, more data about the existing probes (~100) in the Portal, recommendations for the use of those probes.

The Portal works closely with Target 2035, a global effort to provide high quality chemical or biological probes for every protein in the human proteome by 2035.

== Board of directors ==
In June 2016, the Portal announced its founding Board of Directors including Mark Bunnage (Vertex), Aled Edwards (SGC), Yung Lie (Damon Runyon Cancer Research Foundation), Herbert Waldmann (Max Planck Institute of Molecular Physiology), Tim Willson (SGC UNC), and Paul Workman (ICR).

== Scientific Expert Review Panel (SERP) ==
The SERP, an international collection of experts from the fields of medicinal chemistry, pharmacology, and chemical biology, was created to provide the Portal with expert advice. The SERP considers submitted chemical probes and makes recommendations for their use. In addition to considering chemical probes, SERP members also provide strategic and scientific advice to Portal staff to help ensure the Portal stays in tune with the scientific community and its needs. The Portal issued an open call for new SERP members to join the effort in May 2016, which will remain open until the SERP reaches its target membership.

== Procedures ==
The Portal opted for an expert peer-review process to vet and rate chemical probes. Key to this process is the Portal's SERP, who represent a global community and multiple professional environments (e.g., pharma, biotech, clinical centers or academia). These experts bring diverse experiences and expertise to the Portal to help it provide balanced advice to scientists who want to use chemical probes in their experiments without becoming chemical probe experts themselves.

The Portal's review process involves three main steps: 1) probe submission, 2) triage, 3) review and publication. In the first step, scientists who have generated and published chemical probes can submit their probes for consideration. Initially, the Portal can only accept submissions for probes that have been published.

Portal staff consider completed probe submissions to determine whether they are eligible for review. Submissions must meet three criteria to merit consideration by the SERP: 1) the probe is published, 2) it has been deposited into a public database such as PubChem (the Portal can now deposit submitted probes to PubChem on behalf of its users), and 3) there are data supporting its validation in a cellular and/or in vivo model system. Probes that do not meet these criteria are not sent to the SERP for review but are retained in the database. Probes that meet all three criteria are reviewed.

SERP members review each probe submission, including the publication reporting the probe, and rate the probe for its use in cellular and/or in vivo model systems (e.g., mice). Probes are evaluated for use in these two types of systems independently, meaning that it is not necessary for a probe to be validated for use in model organisms for it to be considered and endorsed by the Portal. The Portal has not strictly defined criteria that translate into Portal endorsement. Rather, the Portal relies on its experts, their experience with and knowledge of specific protein targets to assess the quality of a probe. SERP members can comment on each probe, providing guidance to users to ensure they understand the strengths and weaknesses of a probe before they use it.

Probes are published on the Portal along with a highlight of the probe's validation data, and it takes a few weeks for the SERP ratings (denoted with 0 to 4 stars) to emerge. Probe pages also contain SERP comments and links to related databases or sources (e.g., journals) where additional information can be found. Probes must receive an average of 3 stars to earn an endorsement from the Portal.
