= Chemical probe =

A chemical probe is a well-characterized small molecule that selectively modulates the function or abundance of a specific protein of interest. Chemical probes enable reversible or irreversible perturbation of biological pathways and are widely used to investigate protein function, dissect fundamental biological processes in cells and organisms, and validate molecular targets. While early definitions for chemical probes, including criteria for potency, selectivity, and cellular activity, focused on reversible intracellular inhibitors, guidelines for other types chemical probes have been defined, encompassing agonists and antagonists, covalent inhibitors, and targeted protein degraders, such as PROTACs and molecular glues, the latter of which promote protein degradation rather than inhibiting activity.

Chemical probes differ from drugs. Drugs are optimised for clinical properties such as pharmacokinetics and safety, whereas chemical probes are optimised for high target selectivity, potency, and demonstrated cellular target engagement to help ensure that observed phenotypes arise directly from target modulation (https://www.science.org/content/blog-post/chemical-probes-versus-drugs). Incorrect use of poorly selective or unsuitable small molecules can lead to misleading biological conclusions and irreproducible research.

Unlike genetic perturbation technologies such as CRISPR–Cas editing and RNA interference, chemical probes provide rapid, reversible, and tunable controls of protein activity, enabling the study of essential genes, multifunctional proteins, and protein scaffolding roles.

Chemical probes should be used within their recommended concentration range, as higher (excessive) concentrations can lead to off-target effects.

== History ==
Small molecules have long been used as mechanistic tools in biochemistry and pharmacology. Following the publication of the human genome, the main challenge shifted from gene identification to understanding protein function, and selective chemical probes helped stimulate research on understudied targets. Systematic efforts to define chemical probes emerged in the 2010s, when concerns about irreproducibility and misuse of poorly selective inhibitors were highlighted. In response, expert communities developed guidelines and resources, including the Chemical Probes Portal, https://en.wikipedia.org/wiki/Chemical_Probes_Portal), to provide recommendations and best-practice guidance.

Advances in genetics, structural biology, covalent chemistry, and targeted protein degradation have since expanded the types and applications of chemical probes, including targeted protein degraders such as PROTACs and molecular glues.

== Types of Chemical Probes ==
Chemical probes can act through several mechanisms:

Type	Mechanism
Classical modulators	Suppress target activity (commonly for enzymes such as kinases)
Covalent inhibitors	Form irreversible bonds to the target protein
Targeted degraders (PROTACs, molecular glues, dTAGs)	Recruit ubiquitin ligases to degrade target proteins rather than inhibiting them
Activators / Agonists	Enhance or mimic target activity, including receptor agonists and allosteric activators

Notes:

- dTAG molecules are research tool degraders that require fusion of a degradation tag to the protein of interest and are not applicable to endogenous proteins without genetic modification.
- Well-designed probes are commonly used together with inactive control compounds to ensure that observed cellular phenotypes are target-specific rather than due to off-target effects.

== Applications ==
Chemical probes are used to characterize proteins and pathways across diverse experimental systems, including mammalian cells, microbes, animal and plant models. Including:

- Characterizing protein function, including roles of proteins with limited or previously unknown activity, a goal also pursued in international initiatives such as Target 2035, which aims to develop chemical probes for every human protein(https://www.thesgc.org/target2035, Target2035).
- Identifying phenotypes that may not arise through genetic manipulation, providing insights complementary to knockout, knockdown, or editing strategies.
- Exploring signalling pathways and regulatory networks across different biological organisms.
- Investigating mechanisms linked to healthy ageing, including factors influencing long-term cognitive, physical, and mental resilience.
- Supporting translational and infectious disease research by examining essential microbial targets and host–pathogen interactions.

== Roles in drug discovery ==
Chemical probes can serve as starting points, providing initial structural scaffolds for drug design for medicinal chemistry optimisation and development of clinically suitable molecules. They play a key role in early-stage drug discovery, particularly during target validation. As tool compounds, they help determine whether modulating a specific protein produces a disease-relevant phenotype, thereby assessing whether a target is viable as a therapeutic target. By exposing cells or organisms to selective probes, researchers can uncover resistance mechanisms and compensatory network behaviour that may compromise potential drug efficacy. Chemical probes also enable the identification of biomarkers that report target engagement in biological systems.

== Quality criteria ==
Standards are recommended to help ensure that chemical probes deliver reliable biological insights (https://www.chemicalprobes.org/).

Guidelines include:

1. Biochemical potency – often sub-100nM (IC_{50}/Ki/Kd) in assays using purified protein.
2. Selectivity – typically ≥30-fold over related homologues, supported by broader profiling across protein families.
3. Target engagement and cellular activity – demonstrated through biochemical, biophysical, or proteomics-based assays below 1μM, without nonspecific toxicity or off-target effects.
4. Properties – solubility and absence of assay interference or general cytotoxicity.
5. Availability of controls – ideally a matched inactive analogue and, where feasible, an orthogonal active probe with a different chemical scaffold. Negative controls should be used alongside probes to confirm target-specific effects.

== Community resources ==
Several open-access initiatives provide guidance and tools for selecting chemical probes:

- Chemical Probes Portal – expert reviews, best-practice guidelines, and probe ratings. Link website: https://www.chemicalprobes.org/,
- Probe Miner – ranks small molecules using public medicinal chemistry datasets based on potency, selectivity, and other metrics (Link website: https://probeminer.org )
- Probes & Drugs – an open-access database that integrates chemical, biological, and pharmacological data to support the evaluation and comparison of small-molecule probes and drugs https://www.probes-drugs.org/home
- Guide to pharmacology – a curated knowledge base providing expert-reviewed information on pharmacological targets and the ligands that modulate them https://www.guidetopharmacology.org/
- International consortia such as Structural Genomics Consortium (SGC) and EUbOPEN– develop and distribute well-characterised probes for understudied proteins across the proteome. Link website: https://www.thesgc.org/, https://www.eubopen.org/.

These resources provide validated chemical probes and usage guidelines that support reproducible and mechanistic research.

== See also ==
- Chemical Probes Portal
- Chemical biology
- RNA interference
- CRISPR
- PROTAC
- Molecular glue
- Targeted protein degradation
