= Xiang-Lei Yang =

American molecular biologist

Xiang-Lei Yang (杨湘磊) is a Chinese-born American molecular biologist. She is a professor at The Scripps Research Institute, located in La Jolla, California. Her work has contributed to the establishment of physiological importance of Aminoacyl tRNA synthetases beyond their classical role in supporting mRNA translation and their disordered processes that contribute to disease. She founded the Translation Machinery in Health and Disease Gordon Research Conference, an ongoing biannual international conference since 2015. She helped co-found aTyr Pharma, a Nasdaq-listed biotechnology company.

== Early life and education ==
Xiang-Lei Yang was born in Changsha in Southern China, as the younger child of Benlian Yang (杨本濂) and Xiulan Gu (谷秀兰). Before she was born, Yang's father was a lecturer at PLA Military Institute of Engineering in Harbin in Northeast China, where her sister Danzhou Yang (杨丹洲) was born. The souring of relations between communist China with the Soviet Union in the 1960s, known as the Sino-Soviet split, led to countrywide strategic relocations and caused Yang's parents and sister to migrate over 2600 kilometers to Changsha where Xiang-Lei Yang was born. Her father became a professor at National University of Defense Technology in Changsha teaching Applied Mathematics. With a great admiration for science and technology, her parents encouraged both sisters to become scientists from a young age. Unlike her sister, who had always been a stellar student, Xiang-Lei was rebellious and lacked motivation. After attending college at Capital University of Medical Sciences in Beijing, she moved back to her hometown but decided soon that there was no future for her in Changsha. With the help of her sister, she became a graduate student in the lab of Andrew H. J. Wang at University of Illinois at Urbana–Champaign, where she learned both NMR and X-ray crystallography techniques to determine atomic structures of DNA molecules and to study their interaction with drug-like small molecules. In 1999 Yang received the Harvey Van Cleave Research Award for a graduate student at the University of Illinois.Yang earned her Ph.D. degree in 2000.

- B.S., Biomedical Engineering, Capital University of Medical Sciences in Beijing, 1993
- Ph.D., Biophysics and Computational Biology, University of Illinois at Urbana-Champaign, 2000

== Scientific contributions ==
Based on strong encouragement from her Ph.D. advisor, Yang joined the lab of Paul Schimmel at The Scripps Research Institute as a postdoctoral scientist. The Schimmel lab had just discovered that a member of the human aminoacyl-tRNA synthetase family (tyrosyl-tRNA synthetase; TyrRS), used for supporting protein synthesis in the cytosol, can also be secreted out of the cell, where it can be activated by proteolysis to release cytokine-like functions for cell signaling purpose. The first project Yang undertook in the Schimmel lab was to solve the crystal structure of the human TyrRS to understand the structural basis for this cytokine activation. She successfully determined the structure and, after screening hundreds of crystals, pushed the resolution to 1.18 Å, the highest resolution for any atomic structure of an aminoacyl-tRNA synthetases thus far. Her research elucidated the mechanism of cytokine activation that led to a constitutively activated form of full-length TyrRS.

Yang became an assistant professor at The Scripps Research Institute Department of Molecular Medicine in 2005. She was promoted to associate professor in 2008 and to tenured full professor in 2014. At Scripps, she has continued making scientific advances in this field while running her own research laboratory. Yang and her lab have solved the first crystal structure of many human aminoacyl-tRNA synthetases (aaRS). These not only provided the structural basis for various functions of tRNA synthetases, but also revealed intrinsically disordered regions (IDRs) in human human tRNA synthetases in contrast to their counterparts in lower organisms. Yang proposed that these IDRs play an important role in expanding the tRNA synthetase 'functionome' during evolution.

While working on structure analysis of tRNA synthetases, Yang encountered a significant knowledge gap in the field, which was the physiological role of the 'new' functions of tRNA synthetases. Yang looked for the connection to human diseases. Her initial focus was on a neurodegenerative disease called Charcot–Marie–Tooth disease (CMT), because the aminoacyl-tRNA synthetases are the largest gene family causatively linked to CMT. The Yang lab and their collaborators extensively studied the canonical enzymatic function of aminoacyl tRNA synthetases in relation to CMT and excluded a loss-of-function disease mechanism. Instead, their work has established that dysregulations of regulatory functions of tRNA synthetases contribute critically to the etiology of CMT disease, uncovering yet another new role for human aminoacyl-tRNA synthetases beyond their classical enzymatic activity. Work on seryl-tRNA synthetase (SerRS) demonstrated for the first time that an appended domain dispensable for enzymatic activity of SerRS can be essential for the development of vertebrates.

Demonstration of these broader physiological roles embedded in the genes of human aminoacyl tRNA synthetases has caused a paradigm shift in the field of human genetics and has led to new avenues for therapeutic approaches to treat a wide variety of human diseases such as inflammatory disease, autoimmune disease, cancer and neurological disorders. In 2005, Schimmel and Yang founded aTyr Pharma, a biotechnology company pursuing tRNA synthetase derived molecules, for therapeutic applications.

The Yang lab has unveiled broad regulatory roles of tRNA synthetases in vascular biology, the circulatory system, stress response, and proteostasis and provided in-depth mechanistic understanding of these non-canonical functions at the levels of whole organisms, cells, and molecules.

Yang has published over 80 peer-reviewed papers, and is an inventor on three issued US patents and nine pending US patent applications.

== Selected publications ==
- Yang XL, Wang AH. Structural analysis of Z-Z DNA junctions with A:A and T:T mismatched base pairs by NMR. Biochemistry. 1997;36(14):4258‐4267.
- Yang, XL; Skene, Robert J.; McRee, Duncan E.; Schimmel, Paul (2002). "Crystal structure of a human aminoacyl-tRNA synthetase cytokine". Proceedings of the National Academy of Sciences. 99 (24): 15369–15374.
- Yang XL, Otero FJ, Ewalt KL, et al. Two conformations of a crystalline human tRNA synthetase-tRNA complex: implications for protein synthesis. EMBO J. 2006;25(12):2919‐2929.
- Yang XL, Kapoor M, Otero FJ, et al. Gain-of-function mutational activation of human tRNA synthetase procytokine. Chem Biol. 2007;14(12):1323‐1333.
- Zhou Q, Kapoor M, Guo M, et al. Orthogonal use of a human tRNA synthetase active site to achieve multifunctionality. Nat Struct Mol Biol. 2010;17(1):57‐61.
- Guo M, Yang XL, Schimmel P. New functions of aminoacyl-tRNA synthetases beyond translation. Nat Rev Mol Cell Biol. 2010;11(9):668‐674.
- He W, Zhang HM, Chong YE, Guo M, Marshall AG, Yang XL. Dispersed disease-causing neomorphic mutations on a single protein promote the same localized conformational opening. Proc Natl Acad Sci U S A. 2011;108(30):12307‐12312.
- Fu G, Xu T, Shi Y, Wei N, Yang XL. tRNA-controlled nuclear import of a human tRNA synthetase. J Biol Chem. 2012;287(12):9330‐9334.
- Xu X, Shi Y, Zhang HM, et al. Unique domain appended to vertebrate tRNA synthetase is essential for vascular development. Nat Commun. 2012;3:681. Published 2012 Feb 21.
- Yang XL. Structural disorder in expanding the functionome of aminoacyl-tRNA synthetases. Chem Biol. 2013;20(9):1093‐1099.
- Shi, Yi; Xu, Xiaoling; Zhang, Qian; Fu, Guangsen; Mo, Zhongying; Wang, George S; Kishi, Shuji; Yang, Xiang-Lei (2014-06-17). "tRNA synthetase counteracts c-Myc to develop functional vasculature". eLife. 3: e02349.
- Wei N, Shi Y, Truong LN, et al. Oxidative stress diverts tRNA synthetase to nucleus for protection against DNA damage. Mol Cell. 2014;56(2):323‐332.
- He W, Bai G, Zhou H, et al. CMT2D neuropathy is linked to the neomorphic binding activity of glycyl-tRNA synthetase. Nature. 2015;526(7575):710‐714.
- Mo Z, Zhang Q, Liu Z, et al. Neddylation requires glycyl-tRNA synthetase to protect activated E2. Nat Struct Mol Biol. 2016;23(8):730‐737.
- Sun L, Gomes AC, He W, et al. Evolutionary Gain of Alanine Mischarging to Noncognate tRNAs with a G4:U69 Base Pair. J Am Chem Soc. 2016;138(39):12948‐12955.
- Blocquel D, Li S, Wei N, et al. Alternative stable conformation capable of protein misinteraction links tRNA synthetase to peripheral neuropathy. Nucleic Acids Res. 2017;45(13):8091‐8104.
- Mo Z, Zhao X, Liu H, et al. Aberrant GlyRS-HDAC6 interaction linked to axonal transport deficits in Charcot-Marie-Tooth neuropathy. Nat Commun. 2018;9(1):1007. Published 2018 Mar 8.
- Wei N, Zhang Q, Yang XL. Neurodegenerative Charcot-Marie-Tooth disease as a case study to decipher novel functions of aminoacyl-tRNA synthetases. J Biol Chem. 2019;294(14):5321‐5339.
- Blocquel D, Sun L, Matuszek Z, et al. CMT disease severity correlates with mutation-induced open conformation of histidyl-tRNA synthetase, not aminoacylation loss, in patient cells. Proc Natl Acad Sci U S A. 2019;116(39):19440‐19448.
- Bervoets S, Wei N, Erfurth ML, et al. Transcriptional dysregulation by a nucleus-localized aminoacyl-tRNA synthetase associated with Charcot-Marie-Tooth neuropathy. Nat Commun. 2019;10(1):5045. Published 2019 Nov 6.
