= Cheryl Arrowsmith =

Canadian structural biologist (born 1959)

- Born: 1959 (age 66–67); Hackensack, New Jersey
- Education: BSc, Allegheny College; PhD, chemistry, 1987, University of Toronto
- Scientific career
- Fields: Structural biology
- Workplaces: Structural Genomics Consortium
- Thesis: Two studies in physical organic chemistry: bifunctional catalysis of the decomposition of the nitramide anion: hydrogen isotope effects on carbon-13 NMR chemical shifts (1987)
- Website: nmr.uhnres.utoronto.ca/arrowsmith/

Cheryl Hillock Arrowsmith FRSC (born 1959) is an American-Canadian structural biologist. She is the Chief Scientist at the Toronto laboratory of the Structural Genomics Consortium. Her contributions to protein structural biology include the use of NMR and X-ray crystallography to pursue structures of proteins on a proteome wide scale.

== Early life and education ==
Arrowsmith was born in 1959 in Hackensack, New Jersey. She completed her Bachelor of Science degree at Allegheny College and her PhD in chemistry at the University of Toronto in 1987. While completing her PhD, Arrowsmith became interested in tumour suppressor p53 and related proteins after taking a course in nuclear magnetic resonance (NMR). This motivated her to complete her postdoctoral studies at Stanford University with Oleg Jardetzky in his Magnetic Resonance Lab.

== Career ==
Arrowsmith's current research focuses on the structural formation of chromatin and epigenetic regulatory factors. As Chief Scientist of Structural Genomics Consortium (SGC) and the University of Toronto, she leads its international open science program, which focuses primarily on the development of new medicines

Arrowsmith was named a Fellow of the American Association for the Advancement of Science (AAAS) in 2015. She was also named as one of the Clarivate Highly Cited Researchers in 2023. In 2020, she was elected a Fellow of the Royal Society of Canada.
