= Potassium channel blocker =

Several medications that disrupt movement of K+ ions

Tetraethylammonium is a commonly used potassium channel blocker

Potassium channel blockers are agents which interfere with conduction through potassium channels.

== Medical uses ==
=== Arrhythmia ===
Effect of class III antiarrhythmic agent on cardiac action potential.

Potassium channel blockers used in the treatment of cardiac arrhythmia are classified as class III antiarrhythmic agents. Atrial cardiomyocytes contain a specific subset of potassium ion channels which are absent in the ventricles. Safety and efficacy of anti-arrhythmic potassium channel blockers will be improved by discovery of blockers specific to atria or ventricle.

==== Mechanism ====
Class III agents predominantly block the potassium channels, thereby prolonging repolarization. More specifically, their primary effect is on I_{Kr}.

Since these agents do not affect the sodium channel, conduction velocity is not decreased. The prolongation of the action potential duration and refractory period, combined with the maintenance of normal conduction velocity, prevent re-entrant arrhythmias. (The re-entrant rhythm is less likely to interact with tissue that has become refractory).

==== Examples and uses ====
- Amiodarone is indicated for the treatment of refractory VT or VF, particularly in the setting of acute ischemia. Amiodarone is also safe to use in individuals with cardiomyopathy and atrial fibrillation, to maintain normal sinus rhythm. Amiodarone prolongation of the action potential is uniform over a wide range of heart rates, so this drug does not have reverse use-dependent action. Amiodarone was the first agent described in this class. Amiodarone should only be used to treat adults with life-threatening ventricular arrhythmias when other treatments are ineffective or have not been tolerated.
- Dofetilide blocks only the rapid K channels; this means that at higher heart rates, when there is increased involvement of the slow K channels, dofetilide has less of an action potential-prolonging effect.
- Sotalol is indicated for the treatment of atrial or ventricular tachyarrhythmias, and AV re-entrant arrhythmias.
- Ibutilide is the only antiarrhythmic agent currently approved by the Food and Drug Administration for acute conversion of atrial fibrillation to sinus rhythm.
- Azimilide
- Bretylium
- Clofilium
- E-4031
- Nifekalant
- Tedisamil
- Sematilide

==== Side effects ====
These agents include a risk of torsades de pointes.

=== Anti-diabetics ===
Sulfonylureas, such as gliclazide, are ATP-sensitive potassium channel blockers.

=== Other uses ===
Dalfampridine, A potassium channel blocker has also been approved for use in the treatment of multiple sclerosis.

A study appears to indicate that topical spray of a selective Tandem pore Acid-Sensitive K+ (TASK 1/3 K+) (potassium antagonist) increases upper airway dilator muscle activity and reduces pharyngeal collapsibility during anesthesia and obstructive sleep apnoea (OSA).

== Reverse use dependence ==
Potassium channel blockers exhibit reverse use-dependent prolongation of the action potential duration. Reverse use dependence is the effect where the efficacy of the drug is reduced after repeated use of the tissue. This contrasts with (ordinary) use dependence, where the efficacy of the drug is increased after repeated use of the tissue.

Reverse use dependence is relevant for potassium channel blockers used as class III antiarrhythmics. Reverse use dependent drugs that slow heart rate (such as quinidine) can be less effective at high heart rates. The refractoriness of the ventricular myocyte increases at lower heart rates. This increases the susceptibility of the myocardium to early Afterdepolarizations (EADs) at low heart rates. Antiarrhythmic agents that exhibit reverse use-dependence (such as quinidine) are more efficacious at preventing a tachyarrhythmia than converting someone into normal sinus rhythm. Because of the reverse use-dependence of class III agents, at low heart rates class III antiarrhythmic agents may paradoxically be more arrhythmogenic.

Drugs such as quinidine may be both reverse use dependent and use dependent.

== Calcium-activated potassium channel blockers ==
Examples of calcium-activated potassium channel blockers include:

- Charybdotoxin
- Iberiotoxin
- Apamin
- Kaliotoxin,
- Lolitrem,
- BK_{Ca}-specific
  - GAL-021
  - Ethanol (alcohol)

== Inwardly rectifying channel blockers ==
Examples of inwardly rectifying channel blockers include:

=== ROMK (K_{ir}1.1) ===
Nonselective: Ba^{2+}, Cs^{+}

=== GPCR regulated (K_{ir}3.x) ===
- GPCR antagonists
- Ifenprodil
- Caramiphen
- Cloperastine
- Clozapine
- Dextromethorphan
- Ethosuximide
- Tertiapin
- Tipepidine
- CGP-7930
- Ba^{2+}

=== ATP-sensitive (K_{ir}6.x) ===
- Meglitinides (Non-Sulfonylureas)
  - Mitiglinide
  - Nateglinide
  - Repaglinide
- Sulfonylureas
  - Acetohexamide
  - Carbutamide
  - Chlorpropamide
  - Glycyclamide
  - Metahexamide
- Sulfonylureas (continued)
  - Tolazamide
  - Tolbutamide
  - Glibornuride
  - Glisoxepide
  - Glyclopyramide
  - Gliclazide
  - Glibenclamide (glyburide)
  - Glipizide
  - Glimepiride
  - Glicaramide

== Tandem pore domain channel blockers ==
Examples of tandem pore domain channel blockers include:

- Bupivacaine
- Quinidine
- Fluoxetine
- Seproxetine (Norfluoxetine)
- 12-O-tetradecanoylphorbol-13-acetate (TPA) (phorbol 12-myristate 13-acetate).

== Voltage-gated channel blockers ==
Examples of voltage-gated channel blockers include:

- Some types of dendrotoxins
- 3,4-Diaminopyridine (amifampridine)
- 4-Aminopyridine (fampridine/dalfampridine)
- Adekalant
- Almokalant
- Amiodarone (Note: Amiodarone also blocks CACNA2D2-containing voltage gated calcium channels)
- Azimilide
- Bretylium
- Bunaftine
- Charybdotoxin
- Clamikalant
- Conotoxins, such as κ-conotoxin,
- Dalazatide
- Dofetilide (Note: works by selectively blocking the rapid component of the delayed rectifier outward potassium current (I_{Kr}))
- Dronedarone,
- E-4031 (Note: blocks potassium channels of the hERG-type)
- Guangxitoxin (Note: Primarily inhibits outward voltage-gated K_{v}2.1 potassium channel currents.)
- Hanatoxin
- HgeTx1
- HsTx1 (Note: a very potent inhibitor of the rat Kv1.3 voltage-gated potassium channel)
- Ibutilide,
- Inakalant
- Kaliotoxin
- Linopirdine
- Lolitrem B
- Maurotoxin
- Nifekalant
- Notoxin
- Parabutoxin
- Paxilline
- Pinokalant
- Quinidine
- ShK-186
- Sotalol
- Tedisamil
- Terikalant
- Tetraethylammonium
- Verapamil
- Vernakalant

=== hERG (KCNH2, K_{v}11.1)-specific ===
- Ajmaline
- Amiodarone
- AmmTX3
- Astemizole
- Azaspiracid
- AZD1305
- Azimilide
- Bedaquiline
- BeKm-1
- BmTx3
- BRL-32872
- Chlorpromazine
- Cisapride
- Clarithromycin
- Darifenacin
- Dextropropoxyphene
- Diallyl trisulfide
- Domperidone
- E-4031
- Ergtoxins
- Erythromycin
- Gigactonine
- Haloperidol
- Ketoconazole
- Norpropoxyphene
- Orphenadrine
- Pimozide
- PNU-282,987
- Promethazine
- Quinidine
- Ranolazine
- Roxithromycin
- Sertindole
- Solifenacin
- Tamulotoxin
- Terodiline
- Terfenadine
- Thioridazine
- Tolterodine
- Vanoxerine
- Vernakalant

=== KCNQ (K_{v}7)-specific ===
- Linopirdine
- XE-991
- Spooky toxin (SsTx)

== See also ==
- Potassium channel
- Potassium channel opener
