= Mesylate =

Salt or ester of methanesulfonic acid (CH3–SO2–OH)

Mesylate anion (structural formula)

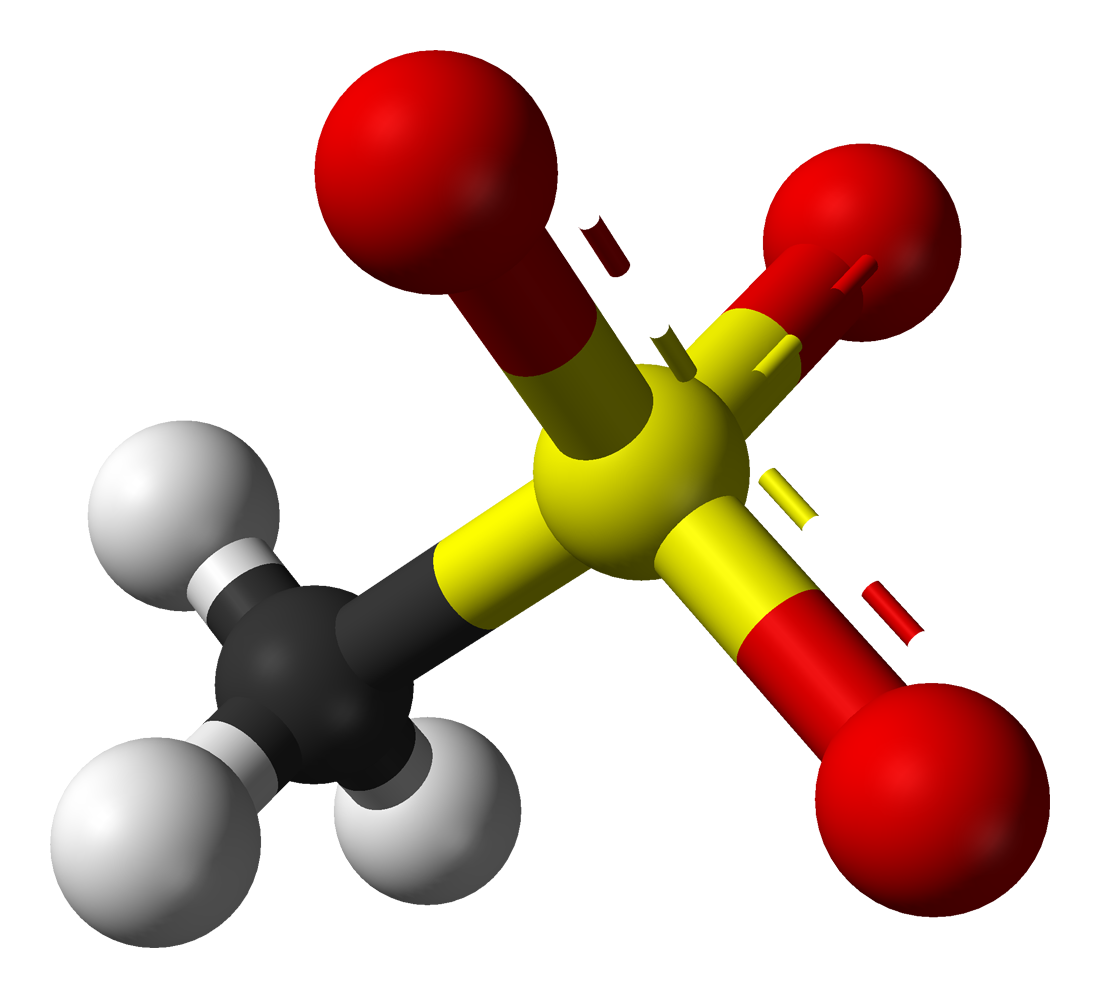
Mesylate anion (ball-and-stick model)

In organosulfur chemistry, a mesylate is any salt or ester of methanesulfonic acid (CH_{3}SO_{3}H). In salts, the mesylate is present as the CH_{3}SO^{−}_{3} anion. When modifying the international nonproprietary name of a pharmaceutical substance containing the group or anion, the spelling used is sometimes mesilate (as in imatinib mesilate, the mesylate salt of imatinib).

Mesylate esters are a group of organic compounds that share a common functional group with the general structure CH_{3}SO_{2}O−R, abbreviated MsO−R, where R is an organic substituent. Mesylate is considered a leaving group in nucleophilic substitution reactions.

== Preparation ==
Mesylate esters are generally prepared by treating an alcohol and methanesulfonyl chloride in the presence of a base, such as triethylamine.

== Mesyl ==
Related to mesylate is the mesyl (Ms) or methanesulfonyl (CH_{3}SO_{2}) functional group. The shortened term itself was coined by Helferich et al. in 1938 similarly to tosyl adopted earlier. Methanesulfonyl chloride is often referred to as mesyl chloride.

Whereas mesylates are often hydrolytically labile, mesyl groups, when attached to nitrogen, are resistant to hydrolysis. This functional group appears in a variety of medications, particularly cardiac (antiarrhythmic) drugs, as a sulfonamide moiety. Examples include sotalol, ibutilide, sematilide, dronedarone, dofetilide, E-4031, and bitopertin.

== Pharmaceutical preparations ==
Mesylate salts are often used in preparing the dosage forms of basic drugs. Mesylate salts often yield a higher solubility, and may also excel in other pharmaceutically-relevant factors such as hygroscopicity, clean polymorphic profile, particle size, and flow properties.

== Natural occurrence ==
Ice core samples from a single spot in Antarctica were found to have tiny inclusions of magnesium methanesulfonate dodecahydrate. This natural phase is recognized as the mineral ernstburkeite. It is extremely rare.

== See also ==
- Tosylate
- Triflate, the fluorinated analog of mesylate.
