= C18H28N2O3S =

The molecular formula C_{18}H_{28}N_{2}O_{3}S (molar mass: 352.49 g/mol, exact mass: 352.1821 u) may refer to:

- Almokalant, a potassium channel blocker used to treat arrhythmia
- SB-269,970
