= C23H28ClN5O3 =

The molecular formula C_{23}H_{28}ClN_{5}O_{3} (molar mass: 457.953 g/mol) may refer to:

- Azimilide
- Triazoledione (BMS-180492)
