= AZD1305 =

Names
- IUPAC name 2-Methyl-2-propanyl (2-{7-[2-(4-cyano-2-fluorophenoxy)ethyl]-9-oxa-3,7-diazabicyclo[3.3.1]non-3-yl}ethyl)carbamate

Identifiers
CAS Number	872045-91-5
3D model (JSmol)	Interactive image
ChEMBL	ChEMBL3545169
ChemSpider	13080567
DrugBank	DB11766
ECHA InfoCard	100.170.290
EC Number	642-445-9
PubChem CID	15605092
UNII	CZO834LXQM
CompTox Dashboard (EPA)	DTXSID701030144
- InChI: InChI=1S/C22H31FN4O4/c1-22(2,3)31-21(28)25-6-7-26-12-17-14-27(15-18(13-26)30-17)8-9-29-20-5-4-16(11-24)10-19(20)23/h4-5,10,17-18H,6-9,12-15H2,1-3H3,(H,25,28) Key: BLLNYXOLLAVTRF-UHFFFAOYSA-N; InChI=1/C22H31FN4O4/c1-22(2,3)31-21(28)25-6-7-26-12-17-14-27(15-18(13-26)30-17)8-9-29-20-5-4-16(11-24)10-19(20)23/h4-5,10,17-18H,6-9,12-15H2,1-3H3,(H,25,28) Key: BLLNYXOLLAVTRF-UHFFFAOYAY
- SMILES: O=C(OC(C)(C)C)NCCN1CC2OC(C1)CN(C2)CCOc3ccc(C#N)cc3F

Properties
Chemical formula	C_{22}H_{31}FN_{4}O_{4}
Molar mass	434.512 g·mol^{−1}

Hazards
- GHS labelling
Pictograms	(GHS06: Toxic) (GHS08: Health hazard)
Signal word	Danger
Hazard statements	H301, H373
Precautionary statements	P260, P264, P270, P301+P316, P319, P321, P330, P405, P501
- Except where otherwise noted, data are given for materials in their standard state (at 25 °C [77 °F], 100 kPa). Infobox references

AZD1305 is an experimental drug candidate that is under investigation for the management and reversal of cardiac arrhythmias, specifically atrial fibrillation and flutter. In vitro studies have shown that this combined-ion channel blocker inhibits rapidly the activating delayed-rectifier potassium current (IKr), L-type calcium current, and inward sodium current (INa).

== Pathology ==
Atrial fibrillation (AF) is a form of cardiac arrhythmia that arises with disorganized and rapid action upotentials conducted through the atria, resulting in irregular atrial contraction. Causes of AF include hypertension, cardiomyopathies, alcohol consumption, viral infections, and sleep apnea, which can cause AF by increasing the occurrence of early after depolarizations (EADs). EAD is an abnormal depolarization and increase in action potential frequency that occurs in cardiac myocytes before normal repolarization is complete.

== Mechanism ==
AZD1305 possesses class III anti-arrhythmic activity by blocking the human ether-a-go-go-related gene (hERG) potassium channel. hERG contributes to the formation of potassium ion channel proteins that are responsible for the conduction of the rapid delayed rectifying potassium current. Blocking this current prolongs action potential duration (APD), increases refractory period, and delays repolarization of cardiac myocytes in the ventricles and atria. Delayed repolarizations increase susceptibility to EAD.

AZD 1305 also acts on voltage gated sodium channels (Nav1.5) by attenuating the peak (INapeak) and late sodium current (INalate), though the latter current is more potently inhibited. Attenuation of INalate by AZD1305 is concentration-dependent and decreases the slope of depolarization and delays repolarization. INalate blockade by AZD1305 depressed the threshold of sodium channel excitation and prolongs APD. Blockade of IKr may lead to excessive prolongation of APD and repolarization instability, which may promote arrhythmic conditions in the heart, including EAD and Torsade de Pointes (TdP). Under IKr blockade a pronounced INalate can contribute to the development of arrhythmias by increasing repolarization variability. AZD1305 blockade of the INalate modulates IKr-blockade induced APD instability, repolarization vulnerability, and variability in beat-to-beat APD.

In vivo, as well as in vitro studies discovered that inhibition of INa and IKr by AZD1305 is much greater in atrial versus ventricular myocytes. This atrial-selective activity of AZD1305 prolongs effective refractory period (ERF) and induces post-repolarization refractoriness (PRR) in atrial myocytes, which aids in suppressing atrial fibrillation.

AF and TdP may be induced with L-type calcium channel hyperactivity and increased calcium release from the sarcoplasmic reticulum. The L-type calcium current is also blocked by AZD 1305 which suppresses the intracellular rises in calcium levels and calcium oscillations that produce EADs. The combined block of INa, IKr, and L-type calcium current is key to the anti-arrhythmic potential of AZD1305 compared IKr blockade alone.

== Benefits ==
Available anti-arrhythmic agents (AAD) used for the maintenance of AF are often accompanied with the risk of developing ventricular pro-arrhythmias, as they are often limited to targeting a single ion channel (i.e., Dofeiltide) and have homogenous activity throughout the heart. AZD1305 offers the advantage of being an atrial-selective AAD and combined ion channel blocker that provides protection against EAD, repolarization dispersion, and ventricular pro-arrhythmias. Simultaneously, AZD1305 suppresses AF in a safe and efficacious manner, which could potentially be an ideal first-line treatment option in the future.
