= C21H27N3O3S =

The molecular formula C_{21}H_{27}N_{3}O_{3}S (molar mass: 401.52 g/mol) may refer to:

- E-4031
- Sonepiprazole (U-101,387, PNU-101,387-G)
