= Almokalant =

Chemical compound

Clinical data
- ATC code: None

Identifiers
- IUPAC name: 4-(3-{Ethyl[3-(propane-1-sulfinyl)propyl]amino}-2-hydroxypropoxy)benzonitrile
- CAS Number: 123955-10-2
- PubChem CID: 3033962
- ChemSpider: 2298526
- UNII: I9NG89L275
- ChEMBL: ChEMBL362103
- CompTox Dashboard (EPA): DTXSID40869693

Chemical and physical data
- Formula: C_{18}H_{28}N_{2}O_{3}S
- Molar mass: 352.49 g·mol^{−1}
- 3D model (JSmol): Interactive image
- SMILES: O=S(CCC)CCCN(CC)CC(O)COc1ccc(C#N)cc1
- InChI: InChI=1S/C18H28N2O3S/c1-3-11-24(22)12-5-10-20(4-2)14-17(21)15-23-18-8-6-16(13-19)7-9-18/h6-9,17,21H,3-5,10-12,14-15H2,1-2H3; Key:ZMHOBBKJBYLXFR-UHFFFAOYSA-N

Almokalant is a drug used to treat arrhythmia. It is a potassium channel blocker. It has been found to have teratogenic effects in rats.

== See also ==
- Vernakalant
