= Besipirdine =

Chemical compound

Clinical data
- ATC code: none

Legal status
- Legal status: In general: unscheduled

Identifiers
- IUPAC name: N-propyl-N-(4-pyridinyl)-1H-indol-1-amine
- CAS Number: 119257-34-0
- PubChem CID: 60691
- ChemSpider: 54696
- UNII: 95PY16J933
- ChEMBL: ChEMBL2106094
- CompTox Dashboard (EPA): DTXSID50152361

Chemical and physical data
- Formula: C_{16}H_{17}N_{3}
- Molar mass: 251.333 g·mol^{−1}
- 3D model (JSmol): Interactive image
- SMILES: CCCN(C1=CC=NC=C1)N2C=CC3=CC=CC=C32
- InChI: InChI=1S/C16H17N3/c1-2-12-18(15-7-10-17-11-8-15)19-13-9-14-5-3-4-6-16(14)19/h3-11,13H,2,12H2,1H3; Key:OTPPJICEBWOCKD-UHFFFAOYSA-N

Besipirdine (besipirdine hydrochloride, or HP749), an indole-substituted analog of 4-aminopyridine, is a nootropic drug developed for the treatment of Alzheimer's disease (AD).

== History ==
Besipirdine was first considered for the treatment of obsessive-compulsive disorder (OCD). Hoechst-Roussel Pharmaceuticals, Inc. (Hoecst AG) filed a patent in July 1993 protecting the use of N-(pyridinyl)-1H-indol-1-amines, including besipirdine, for the treatment of OCD, supported by preliminary data gathered from rat studies A US patent 5356910 A. In 1995, Hoechst AG filed a patent protecting the production of besipirdine, this time describing its memory-enhancing, analgetic and antidepressant qualities A US patent 5459274 A. With increasing research on besipirdine uncovering its effects on the cholinergic system, Hoechst AG filed a patent in the following year to protect substituted n-(pyrrol-1-yl)pyridinamines as anticonvulsant agents A1 WO application 1997004777 A1, Huger FP, Kongasamut S, Smith CP, Tang L, "Use off unsubstituted and substituted n-(pyrrol-1-yl)pyridinamines as anticonvulsant agents", published 1997-02-13, assigned to Hoechst Marion Roussel Inc. In the midst of Phase II clinical studies of besipirdine in Alzheimer's disease, Hoechst AG merged with Rhône-Poulenc S.A. to form Aventis Pharma Limited. Under the new company Aventis, besipirdine ultimately failed in Phase III clinical trials due to severe cardiovascular side effects observed in a few patients in separate studies. In January 2004, UroGene acquired exclusive development and commercialization rights to besipirdine from Aventis in order to study its application in urology A1 WO application 2005035496 A1, Dubberke S, Hanna RD, Lee GE, Mueller-Lehar J, Utz R, Weiberth F, "Process for the preparation of n-amino substituted heterocyclic compounds", published 2005-04-21, assigned to Aventis Pharma Inc. In February 2007, UroGene filed its own patent protecting the crystal form of besipirdine chlorhydrate, its production process, and its applications in the pharmaceutical field. The drug is currently undergoing Phase III development for treatment of Lower Urinary Tract Dysfunctions A2 WO application 2007096777 A2, Bienayme H, Ferte J, "Crystal form of besipirdine chlorhydrate, process preparation and use thereof", published 2007-08-30, assigned to Urogene.

== Mechanism of action ==
As a member of the aminopyridine class, besipirdine enhances the release of acetylcholine by blocking M-channels, voltage-gated K^{+} channels, increasing neuronal excitation by depolarizing the cell. Additionally, besipirdine antagonizes the noradrenergic α2 receptor, increasing electrically-stimulated and spontaneous [^{3}H]norepinephrine release from cortical tissue slices, and inhibits norepinephrine uptake. The exact pathway is not yet understood but it has been shown that besipirdine does not open sodium channels, so its consequential effect on norephinephrine release may be Ca^{2+}-independent. Further, [^{3}H]norepinephrine release seems to be dependent on frequency and concentration of besipirdine in that higher frequency of stimulation causes a concentration-dependent inhibition of voltage-dependent K^{+} channels, which leads to inhibition of norepinephrine release.

== Medical uses ==
=== Alzheimer's disease ===
The most successful treatments for AD have been strategies targeting the cholinergic activity in the central nervous system, like acetylcholinesterase inhibitors. Other treatments target the adrenergic system and have been shown to improve memory deficits associated with AD. It was hypothesized that simultaneous treatment for both cholinergic and adrenergic deficits would be more effective than treatment that targeted individual systems alone. Besipirdine was shown to target dysfunctional cholinergic and adrenergic systems in Alzheimer's disease. It has been suggested as an anticonvulsant because of its adrenergic effects. Its effects on the cholinergic system may improve memory and cognitive deficits symptomatic of AD.

=== Other ===
Besipirdine was originally suggested as a treatment for OCD due to its effects on the adrenergic and serotonergic systems. "In vitro" studies of besipirdine indicated its potency in inhibiting serotonin reuptake in addition to norepinephrine reuptake. "In vivo", besipirdine showed efficacy in reducing schedule-induced polydipsia (SIP) in rats. The drug's anticonvulsant properties ultimately led Hoechst AG to pursue it as a treatment for Alzheimer's disease. After its discontinuation in the mid-1990s, besipirdine was re-evaluated as an oral treatment for Over Active Bladder (OAB) and is currently undergoing Phase III clinical trials, under UroGene. Interest in besipirdine as a treatment for OAB was piqued by its known effects on the adrenergic system. In isolated studies, besipirdine showed greater potency than duloxetine on bladder capacity, micturition volume, intercontraction interval, and an increase in striated sphincter EMG activity.

== Pharmacology ==
Besipirdine primarily acts to enhance both cholinergic and adrenergic neurotransmission in the central nervous system. It is administered orally at a maximum tolerated dose (MTD) of 50 mg BID. In Phase II clinical trials, patients were administered 5 mg or 20 mg BID doses of besipirdine. Its N-despropyl metabolite, P86-7480, exhibits transient vasoconstrictor effects, producing a pressor effect of 16 ± 4 mm Hg after intravenous administration of 0.1 mg/kg, in monkey, rat and dog models.

== Pharmacokinetics ==
The pharmacokinetics of besipirdine have been studied in conscious monkey. The calculated elimination half-life (t_{1/2}) of besipirdine and P86-7480 after oral administration of 10, 20, and 40 mg/kg doses is 7.4 ± 2.1 hours. The t_{1/2} after intravenous administration of 10 mg/kg is 1.5 hours. Besipirdine is cleared through the kidneys at 0.13 ± 0.04 mL/min/kg; only 1% of the administered dose is excreted unused via the kidneys. In humans, using doses up to 30 mg, the t_{1/2} of besipirdine and P86-7480 were calculated as 3 hours, and 5.5–7 hours, respectively. Peak plasma concentrations of besipirdine and P86-7480 were calculated as 1.5–2 hours, and 2–3 hours, respectively.

== Adverse effects ==
Besipirdine is reported to be well tolerated. More severe adverse effects, such as bradycardia and postural hypotension, may have been a result of a high ratio of adrenergic to cholinergic potency caused by the metabolite P86-7480, which has direct vasoconstrictor effects. Some studies suggest that the effects of besipirdine on cognition are reversible after withdrawal from treatment, indicating that the efficacy of the drug is primarily symptomatic and not neuroprotective.

=== General ===
- Nausea and vomiting
- Dry mouth
- Headache
- Rash
- Eye disorder
- Urinary frequency
- Mouth ulceration
- Loss of appetite
- Dizziness
- Paresthesia
- General pain

=== Cardiovascular ===
- Bradycardia
- Postural hypotension
- Premature ventricular contractions
- Angina
- Arrhythmia

=== Gastrointestinal ===
- Gastrointestinal disorder
- Flatulence
- Constipation

=== Sleep ===
- Insomnia
- Somnolence

=== Psychological ===
- Mood changes
- Agitation
- Nervousness

== See also ==
- Linopirdine
- Sibopirdine
