= BRL-32872 =

Names
- Preferred IUPAC name N-(3,4-Dimethoxyphenyl)-N-(3-{[2-(3,4-dimethoxyphenyl)ethyl]methylamino}propyl)-4-nitrobenzamide

Identifiers
CAS Number	113241-09-1; 113241-47-7 (HCl)
3D model (JSmol)	Interactive image
ChEMBL	ChEMBL182646
ChemSpider	571091
PubChem CID	656771
UNII	UMV604ENM8; WFVI5D2FH4 (HCl)
CompTox Dashboard (EPA)	DTXSID401116795
- InChI: InChI=1S/C29H35N3O7/c1-30(18-15-21-7-13-25(36-2)27(19-21)38-4)16-6-17-31(24-12-14-26(37-3)28(20-24)39-5)29(33)22-8-10-23(11-9-22)32(34)35/h7-14,19-20H,6,15-18H2,1-5H3 Key: ADAGRLDCCJAKFP-UHFFFAOYSA-N; InChI=1S/C29H35N3O7/c1-30(18-15-21-7-13-25(36-2)27(19-21)38-4)16-6-17-31(24-12-14-26(37-3)28(20-24)39-5)29(33)22-8-10-23(11-9-22)32(34)35/h7-14,19-20H,6,15-18H2,1-5H3
- SMILES: [O-][N+](=O)c1ccc(cc1)C(=O)N(c2cc(OC)c(OC)cc2)CCCN(CCc3ccc(OC)c(OC)c3)C

Properties
Chemical formula	C_{29}H_{35}N_{3}O_{7}
Molar mass	537.613 g·mol^{−1}
- Except where otherwise noted, data are given for materials in their standard state (at 25 °C [77 °F], 100 kPa). verify (what is ?) Infobox references

BRL-32872 is an experimental drug candidate that provides a novel approach to the treatment of cardiac arrhythmia. Being a derivative of verapamil, it possesses the ability to inhibit Ca^{+2} membrane channels. Specific modifications in hydrogen bonding activity, nitrogen lone pair availability, and molecular flexibility allow BRL-32872 to inhibit K^{+} channels as well. As such, BRL-32872 is classified as both a class III (K^{+} blocking) and class IV (Ca^{+2} blocking) antiarrhythmic agent.

== Arrhythmia ==
Cardiac arrhythmia arises from abnormalities in action potential formation and propagation through the heart. Changes in electrolyte balance, or development of ectopic pacemaker activity, disrupt normal heart rhythmicity and conduction. Antiarrhythmic agents are used to manipulate ion flux through membrane channels to restore normal pacemaker activity. Cellular conduction and refractory periods are also modified to eliminate re-entry depolarization causing arrhythmia. Factors contributing to the generation of arrhythmia include: ischemia, hypoxia, acidosis and drug toxicity. If untreated, arrhythmias may present as bradycardia, tachycardia, or progress to atrial/ventricular fibrillation.

== Class III activity ==
BRL-32872’s class III activity is directed towards the human ether-a-go-go-related gene (hERG) K^{+} channel. hERG channels are the source of the delayed rectifier potassium current (I_{K}); the current responsible for repolarization of the cardiac action potential. BRL-32872 binds with high affinity to open hERG channels, and inhibits the rapidly activating component of the I_{K}. BRL-32872 binding effectively increases the refractory period of the cell and prolongs the action potential. This blockage also reduces probability of re-entry depolarization, since signals are more likely to encounter tissue in a refractory state. This effect is particularly well suited for treating atrial and ventricular fibrillation, as it restores pacemaker control of the tissue to the SA and AV nodes. The specific binding site of BRL-32872 on the hERG channel is unknown; evidence suggests however, that it lies within the channels pore, similar to other class III drugs.

== Class IV activity ==
BRL-32872’s class IV activity is similar to that of its parent drug, verapamil. The drug targets L-type Ca^{+2} channels, and decreases conduction in cells where Ca^{+2}is required for action potential upstroke (SA/AV nodes). The result is increased nodal conduction time and refractoriness, restoring normal heart rate in patients with tachycardia. Binding occurs on the pore-forming α_{1}subunit during the open or inactive state. This low level of I_{Ca} inhibition is credited with eliminating some of the proarrhythmial effects of class III drugs. The combined inhibition of K^{+}/Ca^{+2} channels has proven to eliminate the occurrence of early after-depolarizations (EAD’s), in comparison to selective class III agents alone.

== Benefits of BRL-32872 ==
Unlike most antiarrhythmics, BRL-32872’s effects are homogeneous within the various cardiac tissue types (nodal cells, cardiomyocytes, Purkinje fibers). This property helps eliminate repolarization dispersion, a proarrhythmial effect noted in class III agents. BRL-32872 does not exhibit reverse-use dependence; meaning efficacy is conserved regardless of heart rate. The drug is also easily administered orally or via intravenous injection, and has no effect on resting membrane potential. The effects BRL-32872 have been well documented in animal models. However, its effect has not yet been demonstrated in humans. These beneficial experimental results make a strong case for the use of drugs such as BRL-32872, with combined K^{+}/Ca^{+2} inhibition, in first line antiarrhythmial treatment.
