= Sibopirdine =

Chemical compound

Clinical data
- ATC code: none

Legal status
- Legal status: In general: unscheduled

Pharmacokinetic data
- Bioavailability: sus
- Metabolism: sus
- Excretion: sus

Identifiers
- IUPAC name: 5,5-bis(4-pyridylmethyl)-5H-cyclopenta[2,1-b:3,4-b']dipyridine
- CAS Number: 139781-09-2; anhydrous: 122955-18-4
- PubChem CID: 9929210
- ChemSpider: 169416
- UNII: RAG2185DR1; anhydrous: 7IKM67CSEQ
- KEGG: D05833
- CompTox Dashboard (EPA): DTXSID60930596

Chemical and physical data
- Formula: C_{23}H_{18}N_{4}
- Molar mass: 350.425 g·mol^{−1}
- 3D model (JSmol): Interactive image
- SMILES: c5cnccc5CC1(Cc3ccncc3)c2cccnc2-c4c1cccn4
- InChI: InChI=1S/C23H18N4/c1-3-19-21(26-9-1)22-20(4-2-10-27-22)23(19,15-17-5-11-24-12-6-17)16-18-7-13-25-14-8-18/h1-14H,15-16H2; Key:FJYRSJDIZKTXKB-UHFFFAOYSA-N

Sibopirdine, also known as EXP921, is a nootropic drug.

== Synthesis ==
Patent:

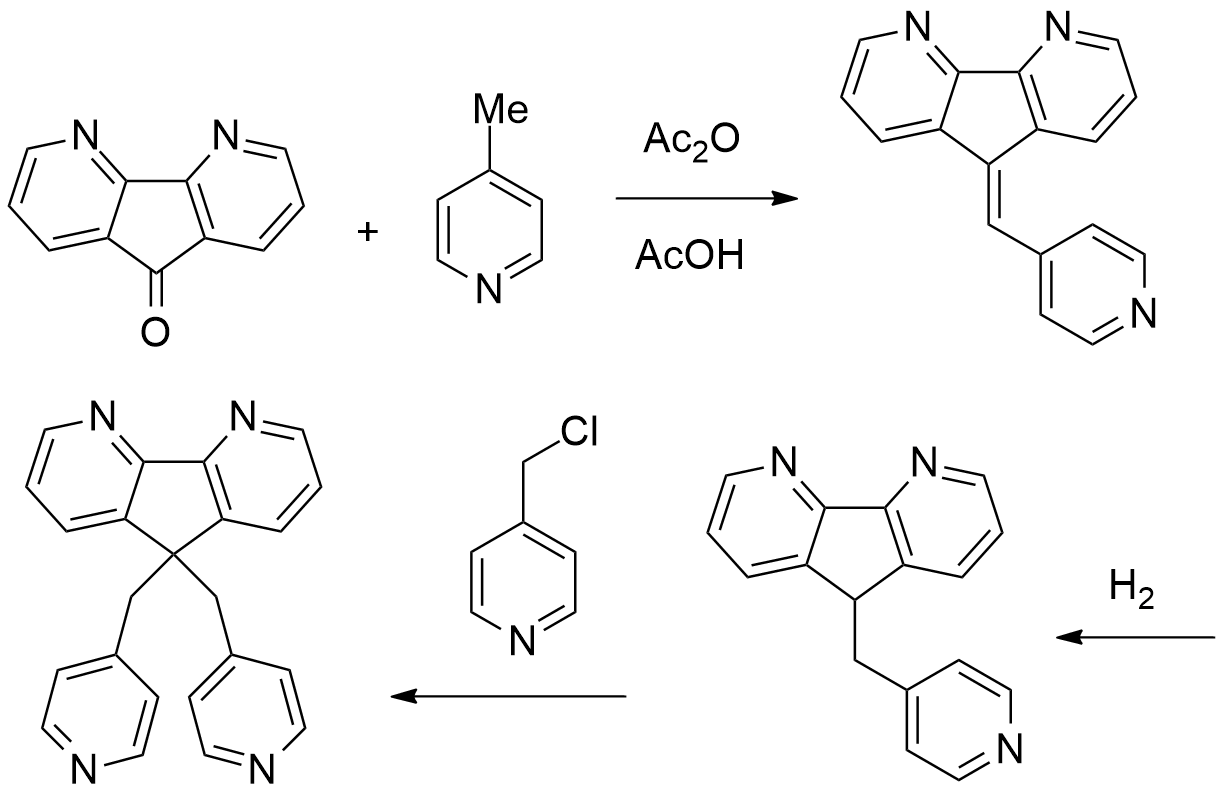

4,5-Diazafluoren-9-one [50890-67-0] (1) is condensed with 4 molar equivalents of 4-picoline [108-89-4] (2) in the presence of 2 equivalents of acetic anhydride and acetic acid. The intermediate from this step may originally be a tertiary alcohol which then dehydrates under the reaction conditions to give [150896-71-2] (3). The olefin can then be reduced either by catalytic hydrogenation over 5% Pd/C or by sodium borohydride in alcohol to give [150896-72-3] (4). Alkylation with 4-picolyl chloride [10445-91-7] (5) in the presence of sodium hydroxide completed the synthesis of sibopirdine (6).

== See also ==
- Besipirdine
- Linopirdine
