= Bramah N. Singh =

Cardiac pharmacologist and academic (1938–2014)

Bramah N. Singh (3 March 1938 – 20 September 2014) was a cardiac pharmacologist and academic.

== Early life and education ==
Born in Fiji, he graduated in medicine from University of Otago (New Zealand) in 1963 and completed residency at Auckland Hospital, followed by a cardiology fellowship at Green Lane Hospital. In 1969, Singh was awarded a Nuffield travelling fellowship and moved to Oxford to work with Miles Vaughan Williams. There, he worked on the anti-arrhythmic properties of drugs including amiodarone. Such work helped to refine the characteristics of Class III compounds in the developing Vaughan Williams classification.

== Career ==
Some reviews on antidysrhythmic drugs during his lifetime credited his work in developing the classification system equally with Vaughan Williams, leading to the classification sometimes being called the Singh Vaughan Williams classification.
