= Cavo-tricuspid isthmus =

Anatomical feature

The cavo-tricuspid isthmus is a body of fibrous tissue in the lower right atrium between the inferior vena cava, and the tricuspid valve. It is a target for ablation for treating atrial flutter.
