= Clofilium =

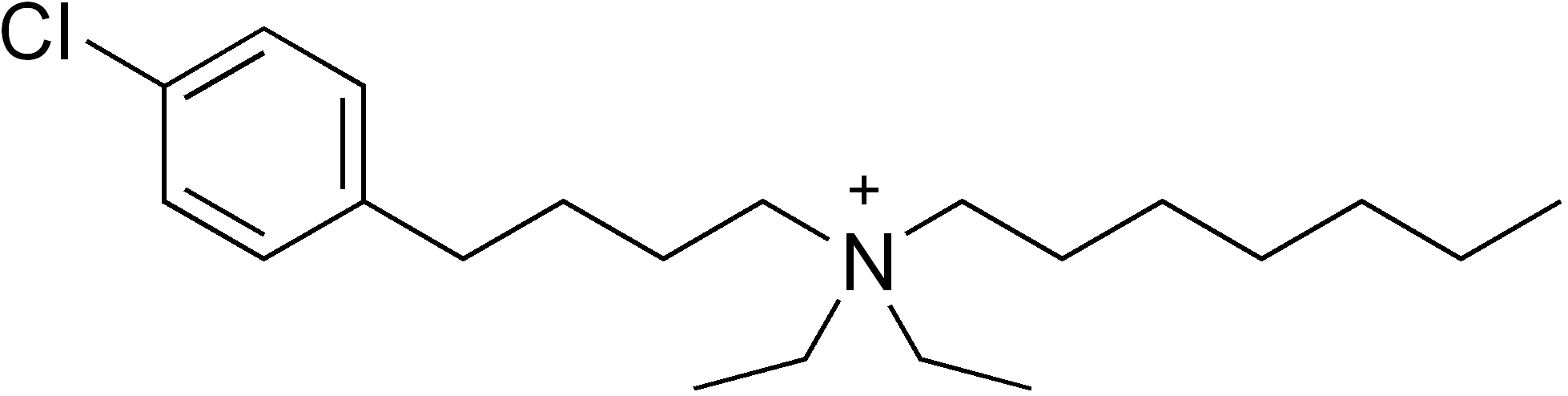

Names
- Preferred IUPAC name N-[4-(4-Chlorophenyl)butyl]-N,N-diethylheptan-1-aminium

Identifiers
CAS Number	68379-02-2
3D model (JSmol)	Interactive image
ChEMBL	ChEMBL9484; ChEMBL32510
ChemSpider	2696
IUPHAR/BPS	2507
MeSH	clofilium
PubChem CID	2798
UNII	847G178BMC
CompTox Dashboard (EPA)	DTXSID9048568
- InChI: InChI=1S/C21H37ClN/c1-4-7-8-9-11-18-23(5-2,6-3)19-12-10-13-20-14-16-21(22)17-15-20/h14-17H,4-13,18-19H2,1-3H3/q+1 Key: WPSYTTKBGAZSCX-UHFFFAOYSA-N; InChI=1/C21H37ClN/c1-4-7-8-9-11-18-23(5-2,6-3)19-12-10-13-20-14-16-21(22)17-15-20/h14-17H,4-13,18-19H2,1-3H3/q+1 Key: WPSYTTKBGAZSCX-UHFFFAOYAR
- SMILES: Clc1ccc(cc1)CCCC[N+](CC)(CC)CCCCCCC

Properties
Chemical formula	C_{21}H_{37}ClN^{+}
Molar mass	338.98 g·mol^{−1}
- Except where otherwise noted, data are given for materials in their standard state (at 25 °C [77 °F], 100 kPa). verify (what is ?) Infobox references

Clofilium is an antiarrhythmic agent.
