= BeKm-1 toxin =

Scorpion toxin

BeKm-1 is a toxin from the Central Asian scorpion Buthus eupeus. BeKm-1 acts by selectively inhibiting the human Ether-à-go-go-Related Gene (hERG) channels, which are voltage gated potassium ion channels.

== Etymology ==
Be is the abbreviation of the scorpion from which the venom is isolated, Buthus eupeus. Km is an abbreviation of M-type K^{+} current, which is inhibited by the venom.

== Chemistry ==
BeKm-1 is a 4 kDa peptide consisting of 36 amino acids with six positively charged residues and six cysteines, which forms three disulfide bridges. The primary amino acid sequence of BeKm-1 is: H-Arg-Pro-Thr-Asp-Ile-Lys-Cys-Ser-Glu-Ser-Tyr-Gln-Cys-Phe-Pro-Val-Cys-Lys-Ser-Arg-Phe-Gly-Lys-Thr-Asn-Gly-Arg-Cys-Val-Asn-Gly-Phe-Cys-Asp-Cys-Phe-OH. Its tertiary structure consists of an alpha-helix and three beta-strands, arranged in a strongly twisted antiparallel beta sheet, compactly fold up. The helix is confined by two ‘caps’ that have also been described in other short scorpion toxins.

BeKm-1 shows structural homology to the family of scorpion venom potassium channel blockers, the α-KTx family. Despite the similarities between BeKm-1 and these scorpion toxins, BeKm-1 belongs to a new subfamily of scorpion K1 channel blocking peptides. The differences between the subfamilies are in the COOH-terminal part: the newly described family of toxins, BeKm-1 included, contains Arg 17, Val 29 and Phe32, while the older one Lys, Met and Lys.

== Mode of action ==
BekM-1 selectively inhibits hERG potassium channels that are coded by the human ether-a-go-go-related gene. By toxin mutagenesis study it is found that the positive residues are important for the binding of BeKm-1 to the HERG channel. The important residues located in the alpha helix (Lys-23, Arg-20, Lys-18 and Tyr 11) form a positive electrostatic surface of the molecule that interact with the negatively charged outer vestibule of the hERG channel to suppress its currents. The HERG channel is bound both in its resting and activated state by BeKm-1; BeKm-1 unbinds in the inactivated state. By binding above the pore entrance, BeKm-1 does not totally block the K^{+} flux through the pore. The toxic blocks the channel with an IC50 of 3.3 nM. The hERG channels are prominently expressed in myocytes; inhibition of these channels by BekM-1 prolongs the QT interval in the ECG.

== Toxicity ==
The LD_{50} of subcutaneous injection of the venom of Buthus eupeus in mice is 1.45 mg/kg.

== Treatment ==
Anti-venom of Androctonus crassicaude can be used in the treatment of envenomation by Buthus eupeus scorpion stings.
