= Terfenadine =

Chemical compound

Clinical data
- Trade names: Seldane, Triludan, Teldane
- AHFS/Drugs.com: Multum Consumer Information
- MedlinePlus: a600034
- Routes of administration: By mouth
- ATC code: R06AX12 (WHO)

Legal status
- Legal status: Withdrawn in most of the world Prescription only in China

Pharmacokinetic data
- Protein binding: 70%
- Metabolism: Hepatic (CYP3A4)
- Metabolites: Fexofenadine
- Elimination half-life: 3.5 hours

Identifiers
- IUPAC name: (RS)-1-(4-tert-butylphenyl)-4-{4-[hydroxy(diphenyl)methyl]piperidin-1-yl}-butan-1-ol
- CAS Number: 50679-08-8
- PubChem CID: 5405
- IUPHAR/BPS: 2608
- DrugBank: DB00342
- ChemSpider: 5212
- UNII: 7BA5G9Y06Q
- KEGG: D00521
- ChEMBL: ChEMBL17157
- CompTox Dashboard (EPA): DTXSID2023642
- ECHA InfoCard: 100.051.537

Chemical and physical data
- Formula: C_{32}H_{41}NO_{2}
- Molar mass: 471.685 g·mol^{−1}
- 3D model (JSmol): Interactive image
- Chirality: Racemic mixture
- SMILES: OC(c1ccccc1)(c2ccccc2)C4CCN(CCCC(O)c3ccc(cc3)C(C)(C)C)CC4
- InChI: InChI=1S/C32H41NO2/c1-31(2,3)26-18-16-25(17-19-26)30(34)15-10-22-33-23-20-29 (21-24-33)32(35,27-11-6-4-7-12-27)28-13-8-5-9-14-28/ h4-9,11-14,16-19,29-30,34-35H,10,15,20-24H2,1-3H3; Key:GUGOEEXESWIERI-UHFFFAOYSA-N

Terfenadine is an antihistamine formerly used for the treatment of allergic conditions. It was brought to market by Hoechst Marion Roussel (now Sanofi) and was marketed under various brand names, including Seldane in the United States, Triludan in the United Kingdom, and Teldane in Australia. It was superseded by its active metabolite fexofenadine in the 1990s due to the risk of a particular type of disruption of the electrical rhythms of the heart (specifically cardiac arrhythmia caused by QT interval prolongation) and has been withdrawn from most markets worldwide.

== Medical uses ==
Terfenadine is still used in some countries for reliving the symptoms of asthma, allergic rhinitis, acute and chronic urticaria, and hay fever.

== Pharmacology ==
Terfenadine acts as a peripherally-selective antihistamine, or antagonist of the histamine H_{1} receptor. It is a prodrug, generally completely metabolized to the active form fexofenadine in the liver by the enzyme cytochrome P450 3A4. Due to its near complete metabolism by the liver immediately after leaving the gut, terfenadine normally is not measurable in the plasma. Terfenadine itself, however, is cardiotoxic at higher doses, while its major active metabolite fexofenadine is not. Terfenadine, in addition to its antihistamine effects, also acts as a potassium channel blocker (K_{v}11.1 encoded by the gene hERG). Since its active metabolite is not a potassium channel blocker, no cardiotoxicity is associated with fexofenadine. Sudden toxicity is possible even after years of use without problems as a result of an interaction with other medications such as erythromycin and ketoconazole, or foods such as grapefruit. The addition of, or a dosage increase in, these CYP3A4 inhibitors makes it harder for the body to metabolize and remove terfenadine. In larger plasma concentrations, it may lead to toxic effects on the heart's rhythm (e.g. ventricular tachycardia and torsades de pointes). Terfenadine also inhibits CYP2J2.

== History ==
Terfenadine was synthesized by chemists at Richardson–Merrell in 1973 as a potential tranquilizer. However, it was found to be inactive for such purposes as it did not cross the blood–brain barrier or enter the central nervous system. Pharmacologist Richard Kinsolving noticed that terfenadine showed a structural resemblance to the antihistamine diphenhydramine, so terfenadine was tested as an antihistamine. This identified terfenadine as the first non-sedating antihistamine, making it the pioneering member of the second-generation antihistamines.

In the United States, terfenadine as Seldane was brought to market in 1985 as the first non-sedating antihistamine for the treatment of allergic rhinitis. In June 1990, evidence of serious ventricular arrhythmias among those taking Seldane prompted the FDA to issue a report on the risk factors associated with concomitant use of the drug with macrolide antibiotics and ketoconazole. Two months later, the FDA required the manufacturer to send a letter to all physicians, alerting them to the problem; in July 1992, the existing precautions were elevated to a black box warning and the issue attracted mass media attention in reports that people with liver disease or who took ketoconazole, an antifungal agent, or the antibiotic erythromycin, could suffer cardiac arrhythmia if they also took Seldane.

In January 1997, the same month when the U.S. Food and Drug Administration (FDA) had earlier approved a generic version of Seldane made by IVAX Corporation of Miami, the FDA recommended terfenadine-containing drugs be removed from the market and physicians consider alternative medications for their patients. Seldane (and Seldane-D, terfenadine combined with the decongestant pseudoephedrine) were removed from the U.S. market by their manufacturer in late 1997 after the FDA approval of Allegra-D (fexofenadine/pseudoephedrine). Terfenadine-containing drugs were subsequently removed from the Canadian market in 1999, and are no longer available for prescription in the UK.

Tefenadine is still available in China and listed on the 2020 edition of the Pharmacopoeia of the People's Republic of China, but has become largely obsolete.
