= Nifekalant =

Chemical compound

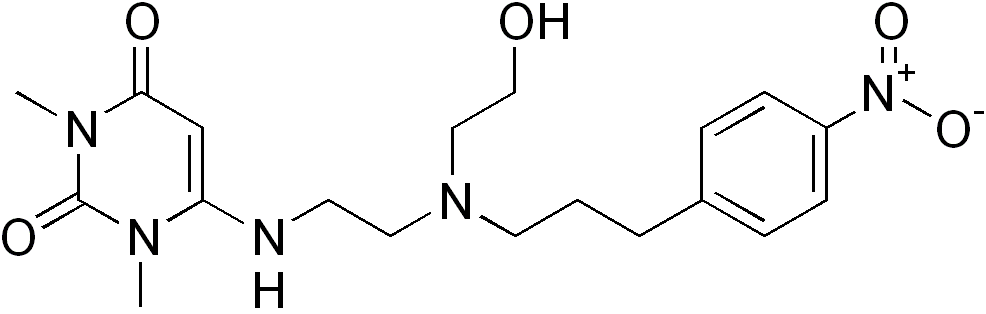

Clinical data
- AHFS/Drugs.com: International Drug Names
- Routes of administration: IV
- ATC code: none

Legal status
- Legal status: In general: ℞ (Prescription only)

Identifiers
- IUPAC name: 6-[(2-{(2-hydroxyethyl)[3-(4-nitrophenyl)propyl]amino}ethyl)amino]-1,3-dimethylpyrimidine-2,4(1H,3H)-dione
- CAS Number: 130636-43-0
- PubChem CID: 4486
- ChemSpider: 4331
- UNII: 5VZ7GZM43E
- CompTox Dashboard (EPA): DTXSID7048374

Chemical and physical data
- Formula: C_{19}H_{27}N_{5}O_{5}
- Molar mass: 405.455 g·mol^{−1}
- 3D model (JSmol): Interactive image
- SMILES: Cn1c(NCCN(CCO)CCCc2ccc([N+](=O)[O-])cc2)cc(=O)n(C)c1=O
- InChI: InChI=1S/C19H27N5O5/c1-21-17(14-18(26)22(2)19(21)27)20-9-11-23(12-13-25)10-3-4-15-5-7-16(8-6-15)24(28)29/h5-8,14,20,25H,3-4,9-13H2,1-2H3; Key:OEBPANQZQGQPHF-UHFFFAOYSA-N

Nifekalant (INN) is a class III antiarrhythmic agent approved in Japan for the treatment of arrhythmias and ventricular tachycardia. It has the brand name Shinbit.
