= Tedisamil =

Chemical compound

Clinical data
- ATC code: C01BD06 (WHO)

Identifiers
- IUPAC name: 3,7-Bis(cyclopropylmethyl)-3,7-diazaspiro[bicyclo[3.3.1]nonane-9,1'-cyclopentane]
- CAS Number: 90961-53-8
- PubChem CID: 65825
- IUPHAR/BPS: 2567
- ChemSpider: 28528215
- UNII: A5VAY2U3R8
- KEGG: D06652
- ChEMBL: ChEMBL113461
- CompTox Dashboard (EPA): DTXSID30238334

Chemical and physical data
- Formula: C_{19}H_{32}N_{2}
- Molar mass: 288.479 g·mol^{−1}
- 3D model (JSmol): Interactive image
- SMILES: C1CC2([C@H]3CN(C[C@@H]2CN(C3)CC4CC4)CC5CC5)CC1
- InChI: InChI=1S/C19H32N2/c1-2-8-19(7-1)17-11-20(9-15-3-4-15)12-18(19)14-21(13-17)10-16-5-6-16/h15-18H,1-14H2/t17-,18+; Key:CTIRHWCPXYGDGF-HDICACEKSA-N

Tedisamil (3,7-dicyclopropylmethyl-9,9-tetramethylene-3,7-diazabicyclo-3,3,1-nonane) is an experimental class III antiarrhythmic agent currently being investigated for the treatment of atrial fibrillation. Tedisamil blocks multiple types of potassium channels in the heart resulting in slowed heart rate. While the effects of tedisamil have been demonstrated in both atrial and ventricular muscle, repolarization is prolonged more efficiently in the atria. Tedisamil is administered intravenously and has a half-life of approximately 8 –13 hours in circulation. Tedisamil is being developed as an alternative to other antiarrhythmics as incidence of additional arrhythmic events is lower compared to other class III agents. Tedisamil also has significant anti-ischemic properties and was initially investigated as a potential treatment for angina until its antiarrhythmic effects were discovered. Tedisamil is manufactured by Solvay Pharmaceuticals Inc. under the proposed trade name Pulzium.

== Molecular problem ==
Arrhythmias are broadly defined as abnormal electrical activity in the heart and can affect both the atria and ventricles. Atrial arrhythmias are the most common type of arrhythmia with several subtypes currently described, including atrial fibrillation. In atrial fibrillation, there is continual quivering of the atria as contraction of the muscle is uncoordinated. Under normal conditions, an electrical impulse from the sinoatrial (SA) node is distributed rapidly throughout the atria causing coordinated excitement and inactivation of atrial muscle cell ion channels resulting in uniform contraction and relaxation of the muscle fibres. During fibrillation, other electrical signals overwhelm the SA node and ion channel excitement is no longer uniform throughout the atria. This results in inappropriate activation properties, further preventing uniform contraction and relaxation of the muscle. Subsequent action potentials from the SA node will not be able to uniformly excite the muscle as not all of the channels will be available to open as some will still be held in the inactivation phase. This results in disjointed contraction, or quivering, seen in the atrial muscle during fibrillation.

== Mechanism of action ==
Tedisamil acts to restore normal electrical rhythm in the heart by prolonging the inactivation phase of the muscle. Both atrial and ventricular repolarization is lengthened by tedisamil by blocking multiple potassium channels including the transient outward (Ito), the adenosine triphosphate-dependent (IK-ATP), and the delayed rectifier potassium currents (IKr and IKs). Tedisamil action is dose dependent as currents are blocked longer and more effectively at higher concentrations. Tedisamil activity is greatest on Ito and acts by binding to the channel in its open configuration. This produces a blocked state and delays its inactivation. To restore normal function, tedisamil must unbind from the channel so that it can inactivate and eventually reopen. Similar mechanisms have been observed on the IKr and IKs currents. In both Ito and delayed rectifier channels, the tedisamil binding site appears to be internal as both binding and unbinding occur more effectively when tedisamil is applied inside the cell. Tedisamil also appears to provide specific, single channel blocking of IK-ATP at high concentrations. As the potassium channels are responsible for restoring the resting membrane potential during an action potential, lengthening their inactivation will stop the cycle of fibrillation by preventing muscle contraction until all ion channels are available to open. Regular use of tedisamil will prevent further fibrillation and restore normal electrical rhythm. Tedisamil's antiarrythmic activity also appears to be supported by inhibiting sodium currents in cardiac muscle. However this is only observed at concentrations above 20μM, concentrations 20-fold higher than required for potassium channel blocks.
