= Miles Vaughan Williams =

British cardiac pharmacologist and academic (1918– 2016)

Edward Miles Vaughan Williams (8 August 1918 – 31 August 2016) was a British cardiac pharmacologist and academic. He is best known for the Vaughan Williams classification of antidysrhythmic drugs. From 1955 to 1985, he was a Fellow of Hertford College, Oxford, and its Tutor in medicine.

== Life ==
He was born in Bangalore to Stella and Arthur Vaughan Williams. His father, an engineer working on the railways of India, was a cousin of the composer Ralph Vaughan Williams. He received his primary and secondary education from Wellington college in Berkshire, and higher education from Wadham College in Oxford, where he studied philosophy and classics (Greats). He became an ambulance officer during the Second World War. Upon his return to Oxford, he switched from Greats to Medicine.

In 1956, he married Marie, born Londès de Payen de l'Hôtel de Lagarde, with whom he had three children. She died 4 June 2024.

== Scientific work ==
He is best known for his work on beta-adrenoceptor antagonists (better known as beta blockers), and for the development of the first widely used classification system for antidysrhythmic drugs, commonly known as the Vaughan Williams classification. This classification system is still widely taught. His work has been recognized through an honorary fellowship of the American College of Clinical Pharmacology and an honorary doctorate from the Sorbonne.

== Hertford College ==
Miles was the first full science fellow of Hertford College, Oxford, appointed in 1955. Apart from teaching, his major contribution to the college included improvements to the fabric of the building, and the design of the Holywell Quadrangle. He used funding from pharmaceutical companies to provide travel funds for medical students at the college.

== Selected publications ==
- A classification of antiarrhythmic actions reassessed after a decade of new drugs (1984)
- The multiple-modes of action of propafenone (1984)
- Effects of selective alpha-1-adrenoceptor,alpha-2-adrenoceptor,beta-1-adrenoceptor and beta-2-adrenoceptor stimulation on potentials and contractions in the rabbit heart (1984)
- Effects on rabbit nodal, atrial, ventricular and purkinje-cell potentials of a new antiarrhythmic drug, cibenzoline, which protects against action-potential shortening in hypoxia (1982)

=== Fitness ===
- You Don't Need a Gym (2010)
