= Bretylium =

Chemical compound

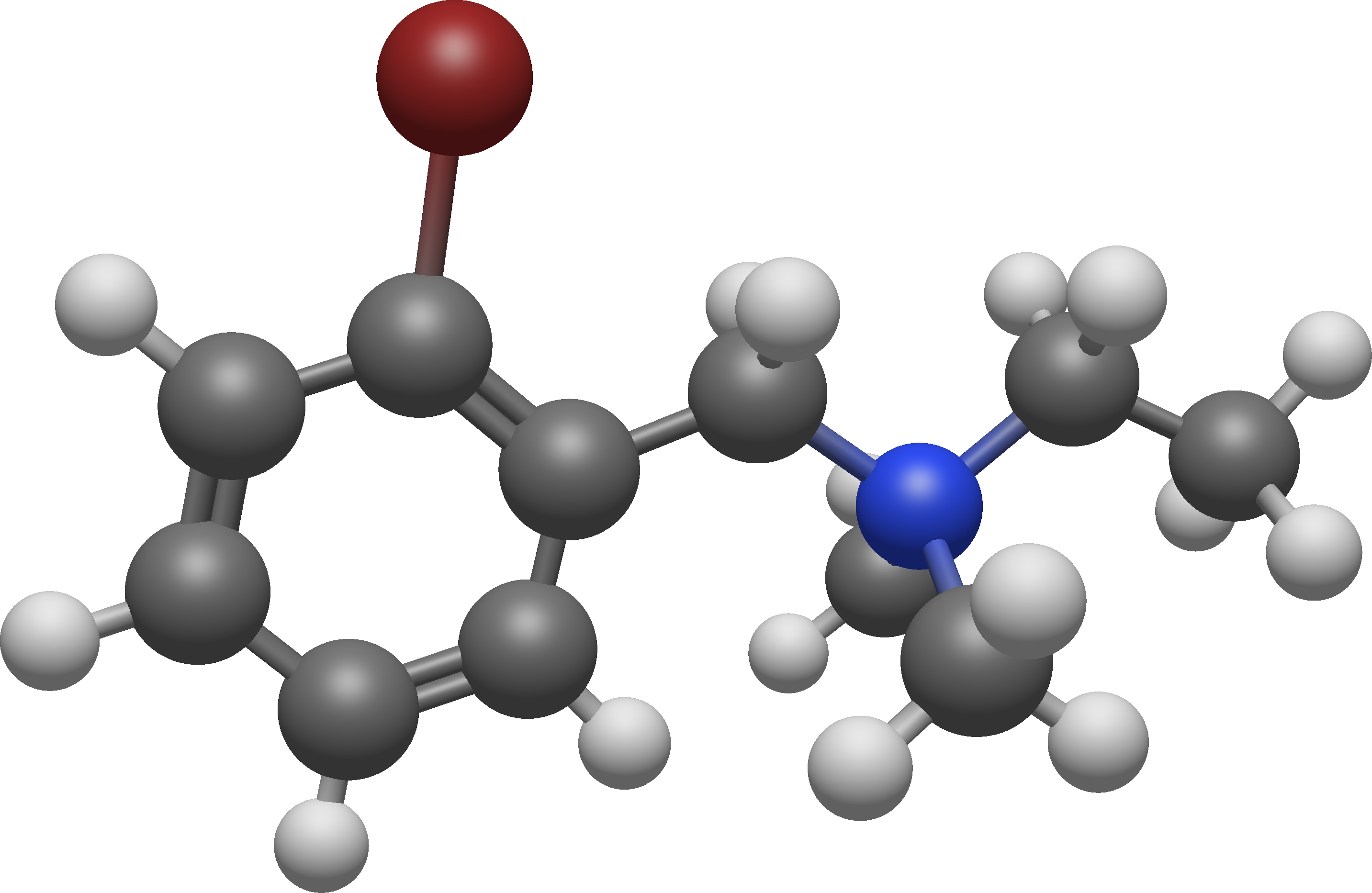

Clinical data
- MedlinePlus: a682861
- Pregnancy category: AU: C
- Routes of administration: IV, IM
- ATC code: C01BD02 (WHO)

Legal status
- Legal status: US: ℞-only

Pharmacokinetic data
- Bioavailability: NA
- Protein binding: NA
- Metabolism: None
- Elimination half-life: 7-8 hours
- Excretion: Renal

Identifiers
- IUPAC name: N-(2-bromobenzyl)-N,N-dimethylethanaminium
- CAS Number: 59-41-6
- PubChem CID: 2431
- IUPHAR/BPS: 7130
- DrugBank: DB01158
- ChemSpider: 2337
- UNII: RZR75EQ2KJ
- KEGG: C06855
- ChEBI: CHEBI:3172
- ChEMBL: ChEMBL1199080
- CompTox Dashboard (EPA): DTXSID3046958

Chemical and physical data
- Formula: C_{11}H_{17}BrN^{+}
- Molar mass: 243.168 g·mol^{−1}
- 3D model (JSmol): Interactive image
- SMILES: Brc1ccccc1C[N+](CC)(C)C
- InChI: InChI=1S/C11H17BrN/c1-4-13(2,3)9-10-7-5-6-8-11(10)12/h5-8H,4,9H2,1-3H3/q+1; Key:AAQOQKQBGPPFNS-UHFFFAOYSA-N

Bretylium (also bretylium tosylate) is an antiarrhythmic agent. It blocks the release of noradrenaline from nerve terminals. In effect, it decreases output from the peripheral sympathetic nervous system. It also acts by blocking K^{+} channels and is considered a class III antiarrhythmic. The dose is 5–10 mg/kg and side effects are high blood pressure followed by low blood pressure and ventricular ectopy.

Originally introduced in 1959 for the treatment of hypertension. Its use as an antiarrhythmic for ventricular fibrillation was discovered and patented by Marvin Bacaner in 1969 at the University of Minnesota.

The American Heart Association removed bretylium from their 2000 ECC/ACC guidelines due to its unproven efficacy and ongoing supply problems. Many have cited these supply problems as an issue of raw materials needed in the production of Bretylium. By the release of the AHA 2005 ECC/ACC guidelines there is no mention of Bretylium and it is virtually unavailable throughout most of the world.

On June 8, 2011 bretylium tosylate was announced as unavailable in the US after request of Hospira Inc. to withdraw its NDA from the market. Bretylium will remain on the FDA's discontinued drug list since its withdrawal was not the result of a safety or effectiveness concern. In mid 2019, it was reintroduced.

== Uses ==
The drug was used in emergency medicine, cardiology, and other specialties throughout the 1980s–1990s for the acute management of ventricular tachycardia and ventricular fibrillation refractory to other first line treatments such as defibrillation or lidocaine.

It is contraindicated in patients with AV (atrioventricular) heart block or digoxin toxicity.

Bretylium should be used only in an ICU or emergency department setting and should not be used elsewhere due to its dramatic actions and its predominant side effect of hypotension.

== Experimental uses ==
It is used in physiological and pharmacological research as an inhibitor of sympathetic transmission. Its mechanism of action is the inhibition of neurotransmitter release from sympathetic nerve terminals, both by the inhibition of action potentials in the nerve terminals and by other mechanisms. Its specificity for sympathetic nerves is achieved because it is a substrate for the noradrenaline transporter; hence, it accumulates inside nerve terminals which have this transporter.
