= Dronedarone =

Medication

Clinical data
- Trade names: Multaq
- Other names: SR33589
- AHFS/Drugs.com: Monograph
- MedlinePlus: a609034
- License data: US DailyMed: Dronedarone
- Pregnancy category: AU: D
- Routes of administration: By mouth
- ATC code: C01BD07 (WHO)

Legal status
- Legal status: AU: S4 (Prescription only); CA: ℞-only; UK: POM (Prescription only); US: ℞-only; EU: Rx-only

Pharmacokinetic data
- Bioavailability: 15% (with a high-fat meal)
- Protein binding: >98%
- Metabolism: Liver (mainly by CYP3A)
- Elimination half-life: 13–19 hours
- Excretion: Feces (84%), urine (~6%)

Identifiers
- IUPAC name: N-(2-Butyl-3-(p-(3-(dibutylamino)propoxy)benzoyl)-5-benzofuranyl)methanesulfonamide
- CAS Number: 141626-36-0
- PubChem CID: 208898
- IUPHAR/BPS: 7465
- DrugBank: DB04855
- ChemSpider: 180996
- UNII: JQZ1L091Y2
- KEGG: D02537; as HCl: D03914
- ChEBI: CHEBI:50659
- ChEMBL: ChEMBL184412
- CompTox Dashboard (EPA): DTXSID3048653
- ECHA InfoCard: 100.109.411

Chemical and physical data
- Formula: C_{31}H_{44}N_{2}O_{5}S
- Molar mass: 556.76 g·mol^{−1}
- 3D model (JSmol): Interactive image
- SMILES: O=S(=O)(Nc3cc1c(oc(c1C(=O)c2ccc(OCCCN(CCCC)CCCC)cc2)CCCC)cc3)C
- InChI: InChI=1S/C31H44N2O5S/c1-5-8-12-29-30(27-23-25(32-39(4,35)36)15-18-28(27)38-29)31(34)24-13-16-26(17-14-24)37-22-11-21-33(19-9-6-2)20-10-7-3/h13-18,23,32H,5-12,19-22H2,1-4H3; Key:ZQTNQVWKHCQYLQ-UHFFFAOYSA-N

Dronedarone, sold under the brand name Multaq, is a class III antiarrhythmic medication developed by Sanofi-Aventis. It was approved by the US Food and Drug Administration (FDA) in July 2009. Besides being indicated in arrhythmias, it was recommended as an alternative to amiodarone for the treatment of atrial fibrillation and atrial flutter in people whose hearts have either returned to normal rhythm or who undergo drug therapy or electric shock treatment i.e. direct current cardioversion (DCCV) to maintain normal rhythm. It is a class III antiarrhythmic drug. The FDA label includes a claim for reducing hospitalization, but not for reducing mortality, as a reduction in mortality was not demonstrated in the clinical development program. A trial of the drug in heart failure was stopped as an interim analysis showed a possible increase in heart failure deaths, in people with moderate to severe congestive heart failure.

The FDA label for dronedarone includes a boxed warning, stating that dronedarone is contraindicated in patients with NYHA Class IV heart failure, NYHA Class II and III heart failure with a recent decompensation requiring hospitalization or referral to a specialized heart failure clinic, or with permanent atrial fibrillation. Dronedarone is also associated with rare cases of severe liver damage, including liver failure.

It is approved as a generic medication.

== Mechanism of action ==
Dronedarone has been termed a "multichannel blocker". However, it is unclear which channel(s) play a pivotal role in its success. Thus, dronedarone's actions at the cellular level are controversial, with most studies suggesting an inhibition in multiple outward potassium currents including rapid delayed rectifier, slow delayed rectifier and ACh-activated inward rectifier. It is also believed to reduce inward rapid Na current and L-type Ca channels. The reduction in K current in some studies was shown to be due to the inhibition of the K-ACh channel or associated GTP-binding proteins. Reduction of K+ current by 69% led to increased AP duration and increased effective refractory periods, thus shown to suppress pacemaker potential of the SA node and return patients to a normal heart rhythm. In a European trial, the average time to recurrence of an arrhythmia was 41 days in the placebo group vs. 96 days in the dronedarone group (similar results obtained in the non-European trial, 59 and 158 days respectively).

== Chemistry ==
Chemically, dronedarone is a benzofuran derivative related to amiodarone, a popular antiarrhythmic. The use of amiodarone is limited by toxicity due its high iodine content (pulmonary fibrosis, thyroid disease) as well as by liver disease. In dronedarone, the iodine moieties are not present, reducing toxic effects on the thyroid and other organs. A methylsulfonamide group is added to reduce solubility in fats (lipophobicity) and thus reduce neurotoxic effects.

Dronedarone displays amiodarone-like class III antiarrhythmic activity in vitro and in clinical trials. The drug also appears to exhibit activity in each of the 4 Vaughan-Williams antiarrhythmic classes.

== Pharmacokinetics ==
Dronedarone is less lipophilic than amiodarone, has a much smaller volume of distribution, and has an elimination half-life of 13–19 hours—this stands in contrast to amiodarone's half-life of several weeks. As a result of these pharmacokinetic characteristics, dronedarone dosing may be less complicated than amiodarone.

== Contraindications ==
- Permanent AF (patients in whom normal sinus rhythm will not or cannot be restored)
- Recently decompensated heart failure requiring hospitalization or Class IV heart failure.
- Second-or third-degree AV block or sick sinus syndrome (except when used in conjunction with a functioning pacemaker)
- Bradycardia
- Concomitant use of a strong CYP3A inhibitor
- Concomitant use of drugs or herbal products that prolong the QT interval and may induce Torsade de Pointes
- Liver or lung toxicity related to the previous use of amiodarone
- Severe hepatic impairment
- QTc Bazett interval ≥500 ms, or use with drugs or herbal supplements that prolong QT interval or increase risk of torsades de points (Class I or III antiarrhythmic agents, phenothiazines, tricyclic antidepressants, certain oral macrolides, ephedra).
- Pregnancy and nursing mothers
- Hypersensitivity to dronedarone
- Hepatic impairment. In January 2011, the FDA advised about cases of rare, but severe, liver injury, including two cases of acute liver failure leading to liver transplant in patients treated with dronedarone (Multaq). It is not known whether routine periodic monitoring of serum liver enzymes (ALT, AST, and alkaline phosphatase) and bilirubin in patients taking dronedarone will prevent the development of severe liver injury.
- PR interval exceeding 280 ms
- Use of cytochrome P-450 (CYP) 3a isoenzyme inhibitors (includes: clarithromycin, cyclosporine, itraconazole, ketoconazole, nefazodone, ritonavir, telithromycin, voriconazole)

== Clinical trials ==
Clinical trials have compared dronedarone to placebo and to amiodarone, for its ability to reduce atrial fibrillation, to reduce mortality overall and from cardiac causes, and for its adverse effects, including excess mortality. Dronedarone is a non-iodinated class III anti-arrhythmic drug which helps patients return to normal sinus rhythm. This treatment for AF is also known to reduce associated mortality and hospitalizations compared to other similar antiarrhythmic agents.

In the EURIDIS and ADONIS trials in atrial fibrillation (2007), dronedarone was significantly more effective than placebo in maintaining sinus rhythm, with no difference in lung and thyroid function in the short term.

However, in the ANDROMEDA study (2007), dronedarone doubled the death rate compared to placebo, and the trial was halted early. ANDROMEDA enrolled patients with moderate to severe congestive heart failure, a relatively sicker patient population.

In a later atrial fibrillation trial, ATHENA, with 4628 subjects, dronedarone was significantly more effective than placebo in reducing the composite endpoint of first hospitalization due to cardiovascular events or death. There was a significant reduction in the rate of cardiovascular death, but not in the rate of death from any cause. Later post-hoc analysis of the ATHENA-results showed a significant reduction in the rate of stroke.

Patients randomized to dronedarone were more likely to develop bradycardia and QT-interval prolongation (but only 1 case of Torsades). Nausea, diarrhea, rash, and creatinine elevation also were more common in the dronedarone arm.

The PALLAS trial (2011) was stopped for safety concerns due to the finding that "dronedarone increased rates of heart failure, stroke, and death from cardiovascular causes in patients with permanent atrial fibrillation who were at risk for major vascular events". A Black Box warning was subsequently added by the FDA stating that the risk of death, stroke, and hospitalization for congestive heart failure doubled in patients with permanent atrial fibrillation.

=== Direct current cardioversion results ===
Dronedarone has been tested in some trials as a way to improve the success rate of electrical cardioversion. In one such trial by the Veteran's Administration it was used prepare patients for electrical conversion to sinus rhythm. In the ATHENA study, 25% of patients were started on dronedarone before cardioversion. The results of a recently concluded randomized study (ELECTRA) may clarify the safety and ideal modalities of dronedarone use at the time of cardioversion.

== Regulatory review ==
Originally submitted as a New Drug Application in 2005, dronedarone was reviewed and recommended for approval in March 2009, by an Advisory Committee of the United States Food and Drug Administration (FDA). The FDA approved dronedarone in July 2009.

Health Canada was the second major regulatory body to approve the drug, giving its approval in August 2009. The approval is for "treatment of patients with a history of, or current atrial fibrillation to reduce their risk of cardiovascular hospitalization due to this condition."

The European Medicines Agency issued a Summary of Positive Opinion regarding dronedarone in September 2009, recommending to the European Commission to grant a marketing authorization within the European Union.

== Research ==
In July 2019, a new drug called poyendarone was patented by the department of pharmacy of National University of Singapore (NUS). It was developed by modifying the dronedarone molecule to remove its tendency to cause ventricular arrhythmia.
