= Dofetilide =

Antiarrhythmic medication

Clinical data
- Trade names: Tikosyn
- AHFS/Drugs.com: Monograph
- MedlinePlus: a601235
- ATC code: C01BD04 (WHO)

Pharmacokinetic data
- Bioavailability: 96% (oral)
- Protein binding: 60% -70%
- Elimination half-life: 10 hours

Identifiers
- IUPAC name: N-[4-(2-{[2-(4-methane sulfonamidophenoxy)ethyl] (methyl)amino}ethyl)phenyl]methanesulfonamide
- CAS Number: 115256-11-6
- PubChem CID: 71329
- IUPHAR/BPS: 2604
- DrugBank: DB00204
- ChemSpider: 64435
- UNII: R4Z9X1N2ND
- KEGG: D00647
- ChEBI: CHEBI:4681
- ChEMBL: ChEMBL473
- CompTox Dashboard (EPA): DTXSID5046433
- ECHA InfoCard: 100.166.441

Chemical and physical data
- Formula: C_{19}H_{27}N_{3}O_{5}S_{2}
- Molar mass: 441.56 g·mol^{−1}
- 3D model (JSmol): Interactive image
- SMILES: O=S(=O)(Nc1ccc(cc1)CCN(CCOc2ccc(cc2)NS(=O)(=O)C)C)C
- InChI: InChI=1S/C19H27N3O5S2/c1-22(13-12-16-4-6-17(7-5-16)20-28(2,23)24)14-15-27-19-10-8-18(9-11-19)21-29(3,25)26/h4-11,20-21H,12-15H2,1-3H3; Key:IXTMWRCNAAVVAI-UHFFFAOYSA-N

Dofetilide is a class III antiarrhythmic agent. It is marketed under the trade name Tikosyn by Pfizer, and is available in the United States in capsules containing 125, 250, and 500 μg of dofetilide. It is not available in Europe or Australia.

== Medical uses ==
Dofetilide is used for the maintenance of sinus rhythm in individuals prone to the occurrence of atrial fibrillation and flutter arrhythmias, and for chemical cardioversion to sinus rhythm from atrial fibrillation and flutter.

Based on the results of the Danish Investigations of Arrhythmias and Mortality on Dofetilide ("DIAMOND") study, dofetilide does not affect mortality in the treatment of patients post-myocardial infarction with left ventricular dysfunction, however it was shown to decrease all-cause readmissions as well as CHF-related readmissions. Because of the results of the DIAMOND study, some physicians use dofetilide in the suppression of atrial fibrillation in individuals with LV dysfunction, however use appears limited: After initially receiving marketing approval in Europe in 1999, Pfizer voluntarily withdrew this approval in 2004 for commercial reasons and it is not registered in other first world countries.

It has clinical advantages over other class III antiarrhythmics in chemical cardioversion of atrial fibrillation, and maintenance of sinus rhythm, and does not have the pulmonary or hepatotoxicity of amiodarone, however atrial fibrillation is not generally considered life-threatening, and dofetilide causes an increased rate of potentially life-threatening arrhythmias in comparison to other therapies.

== Contraindications ==
Prior to administration of the first dose, the corrected QT (QTc) must be determined. If the QTc is greater than 440 msec (or 500 msec in patients with ventricular conduction abnormalities), dofetilide is contraindicated. If heart rate is less than 60 bpm, the uncorrected QT interval should be used. After each subsequent dose of dofetilide, QTc should be determined and dosing should be adjusted.

If at any time after the second dose of dofetilide the QTc is greater than 500 msec (550 msec in patients with ventricular conduction abnormalities), dofetilide should be discontinued.

== Adverse effects ==
Torsades de pointes is the most serious side effect of dofetilide therapy. The incidence of torsades de pointes is 0.3-10.5% and is dose-related, with increased incidence associated with higher doses. The majority of episodes of torsades de pointes have occurred within the first three days of initial dosing. Patients should be hospitalized and monitored for the first three days after starting dofetilide.

The risk of inducing torsades de pointes can be decreased by taking precautions when initiating therapy, such as hospitalizing individuals for a minimum of three days for serial creatinine measurement, continuous telemetry monitoring and availability of cardiac resuscitation.

== Pharmacology ==
=== Mechanism of action ===
Dofetilide works by selectively blocking the rapid component of the delayed rectifier outward potassium current (I_{Kr}).

This causes the refractory period of atrial tissue to increase, hence its effectiveness in the treatment of atrial fibrillation and atrial flutter.

Dofetilide does not affect dV/dT_{max} (the slope of the upstroke of phase 0 depolarization), conduction velocity, or the resting membrane potential.

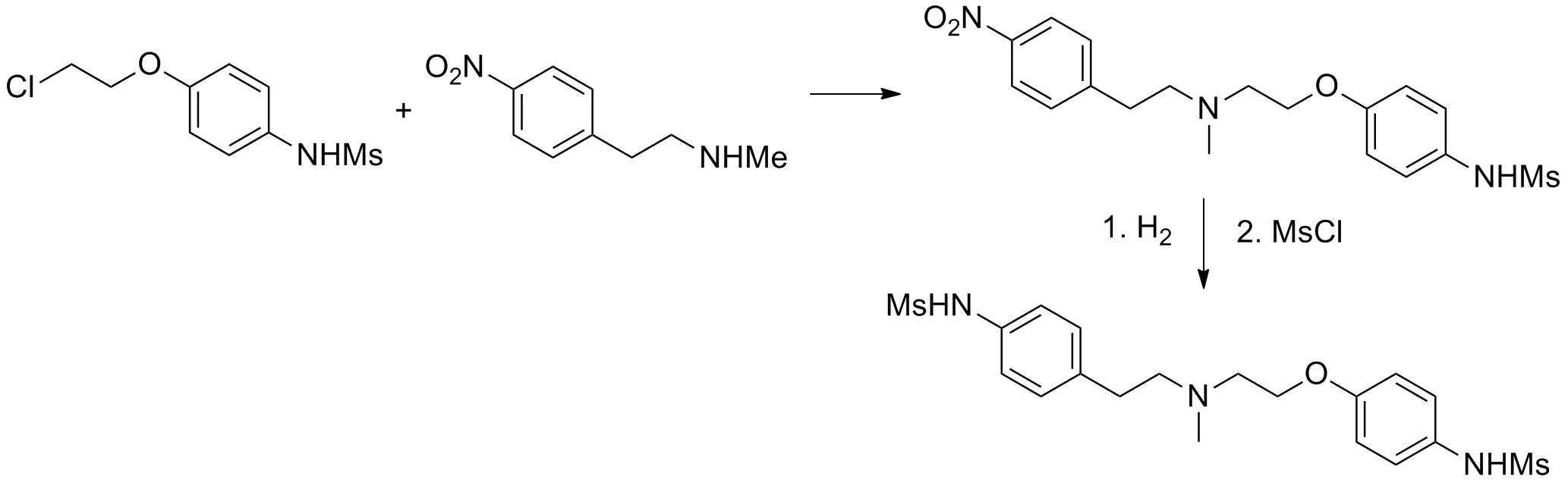
Dofetilide synthesis

There is a dose-dependent increase in the QT interval and the corrected QT interval (QTc). Because of this, many practitioners will initiate dofetilide therapy only on individuals under telemetry monitoring or if serial EKG measurements of QT and QTc can be performed.

=== Pharmacokinetics ===
Peak plasma concentrations are seen two to three hours after oral dosing when fasting. Dofetilide is well absorbed in its oral form, with a bioavailability of >90%. Intravenous administration of dofetilide is not available in the United States.

The elimination half-life of dofetilide is roughly 10 hours; however, this varies based on many physiologic factors (most significantly creatinine clearance), and ranges from 4.8 to 13.5 hours. Due to the significant level of renal elimination (80% unchanged, 20% metabolites), the dose of dofetilide must be adjusted to prevent toxicity due to impaired renal function.

Dofetilide is metabolized predominantly by CYP3A4 enzymes predominantly in the liver and GI tract. This means that it is likely to interact with drugs that inhibit CYP3A4, such as erythromycin, clarithromycin, or ketoconazole, resulting in higher and potentially toxic levels of dofetilide.

==== Metabolism ====
A steady-state plasma level of dofetilide is achieved in 2–3 days.

80% of dofetilide is excreted by the kidneys, so the dose of dofetilide should be adjusted in individuals with chronic kidney disease, based on creatinine clearance.

In the kidneys, dofetilide is eliminated via cation exchange (secretion). Agents that interfere with the renal cation exchange system, such as verapamil, cimetidine, hydrochlorothiazide, itraconazole, ketoconazole, prochlorperazine, and trimethoprim should not be administered to individuals taking dofetilide.

About 20 percent of dofetilide is metabolized in the liver via the CYP3A4 isoenzyme of the cytochrome P450 enzyme system. Drugs that interfere with the activity of the CYP3A4 isoenzyme can increase serum dofetilide levels. If the renal cation exchange system is interfered with (as with the medications listed above), a larger percentage of dofetilide is cleared via the CYP3A4 isoenzyme system.

== History ==
After its initial US FDA approval, due to the pro-arrhythmic potential, it was only made available to hospitals and prescribers that had received education and undergone specific training in the risks of treatment with dofetilide; however, this restriction was subsequently removed in 2016.

== See also ==
- Antiarrhythmic agents
- Cardiac action potential
- Electrocardiogram
