= Ibutilide =

Chemical compound

Clinical data
- Trade names: Corvert
- AHFS/Drugs.com: Monograph
- MedlinePlus: a601248
- Pregnancy category: C
- Routes of administration: Intravenous
- ATC code: C01BD05 (WHO)

Pharmacokinetic data
- Bioavailability: N/A
- Protein binding: 40%
- Metabolism: Hepatic oxidation
- Elimination half-life: 6 hours (2-12 hours)
- Excretion: Renal (82%), fecal

Identifiers
- IUPAC name: N-(4-{4-[ethyl(heptyl)amino]-1-hydroxybutyl}phenyl)methanesulfonamide
- CAS Number: 122647-31-8
- PubChem CID: 60753
- IUPHAR/BPS: 7200
- DrugBank: DB00308
- ChemSpider: 54755
- UNII: 2436VX1U9B
- KEGG: D08060
- ChEMBL: ChEMBL533
- CompTox Dashboard (EPA): DTXSID20861271

Chemical and physical data
- Formula: C_{20}H_{36}N_{2}O_{3}S
- Molar mass: 384.58 g·mol^{−1}
- 3D model (JSmol): Interactive image
- SMILES: O=S(=O)(Nc1ccc(cc1)C(O)CCCN(CC)CCCCCCC)C
- InChI: InChI=1S/C20H36N2O3S/c1-4-6-7-8-9-16-22(5-2)17-10-11-20(23)18-12-14-19(15-13-18)21-26(3,24)25/h12-15,20-21,23H,4-11,16-17H2,1-3H3; Key:ALOBUEHUHMBRLE-UHFFFAOYSA-N

Ibutilide is a Class III antiarrhythmic agent that is indicated for acute cardioconversion of atrial fibrillation and atrial flutter of a recent onset to sinus rhythm. It exerts its antiarrhythmic effect by induction of slow inward sodium current, which prolongs action potential and refractory period of myocardial cells. Because of its Class III antiarrhythmic activity, there should not be concomitant administration of Class Ia and Class III agents.

Ibutilide is marketed as Corvert by Pfizer. Administration resulted in successful heart rhythm control in 31–44% of patients within 90 minutes, with sustained polymorphic ventricular tachycardia in 0.9–2.5% of patients. It appears to show better results in atrial flutter as compared to atrial fibrillation.

== Mechanism of action ==
Ibutilide, like other class III antiarrhythmic drugs, blocks delayed rectified potassium current.

It does have action on the slow sodium channel and promotes the influx of sodium through these slow channels.

Although potassium current seems to play a role, their interactions are complex and not well understood. Ibutilide's unique mechanism works by an activation of a specific inward sodium current, thus producing its therapeutic response in which a prolonged action potential increases myocytes’ cardiac refractoriness in case of atrial fibrillation and flutter.

== Pharmacokinetics ==
=== Absorption ===
Ibutilide is intravenously administered. It has a high first-pass metabolism, which results in a poor bioavailability when taken orally. Individual pharmacokinetic properties are highly viable during the clinical trial.

=== Distribution ===
Ibutilide has a relatively large volume of distribution among individual subjects, which is about 11L/kg. Approximately 40% of the drug is bound with plasma albumin of healthy volunteers in a trial. This is also approximately close to patients with atrial fibrillation and flutter.

=== Metabolism ===
Ibutilide has a high systemic plasma clearance that closes to the hepatic blood flow (29mL/min/kg). Its metabolic pathway is via liver's cytochrome P450 system by isoenzymes other than CYP3A4 and CYP2D6 by which the heptyl side chain of ibutilide is oxidized. With eight metabolites are detected in the urine, however, only one is an active metabolite that shares the similar electrophysiologic property of the Class III antiarrhythmic agents. The plasma concentration of this metabolite is only less than 10% of ibutilide.

=== Excretion ===
After administration of ibutilide, it is quickly excreted by renal pathway with a half-life of approximately 6 hours. Approximately 82% of a 0.01 mg/kg dose is excreted in the urine during the trial. Among those, around 7% is excreted as unchanged drug. The remainder of the drug is excreted in feces (about 19%).

== Adverse effects and contraindications ==
Like other antiarrhythmics, ibutilide can lead to abnormal heart rhythms due to its ability to prolong the QT interval, which can lead to the potentially fatal abnormal heart rhythm known as torsades de pointes. Consequently, the drug is contraindicated in patients that are likely to develop abnormal heart rhythms; this includes individuals who have previously experienced polymorphic ventricular tachycardia, have a prolonged QT interval, sick sinus syndrome, or have recently had a myocardial infarction, among other conditions.

== Patient Information ==
This medication will be given intravenously for your heart disease. You will have continuously ECG monitoring during the infusion and 4 hours after your infusion. Some of the minor side effects are headache and irregular heartbeat. If you experience chest pain and respiratory difficulties, you should report to your doctors immediately.

== See also ==
- Sematilide
- Risotilide
