= E-4031 =

Chemical compound

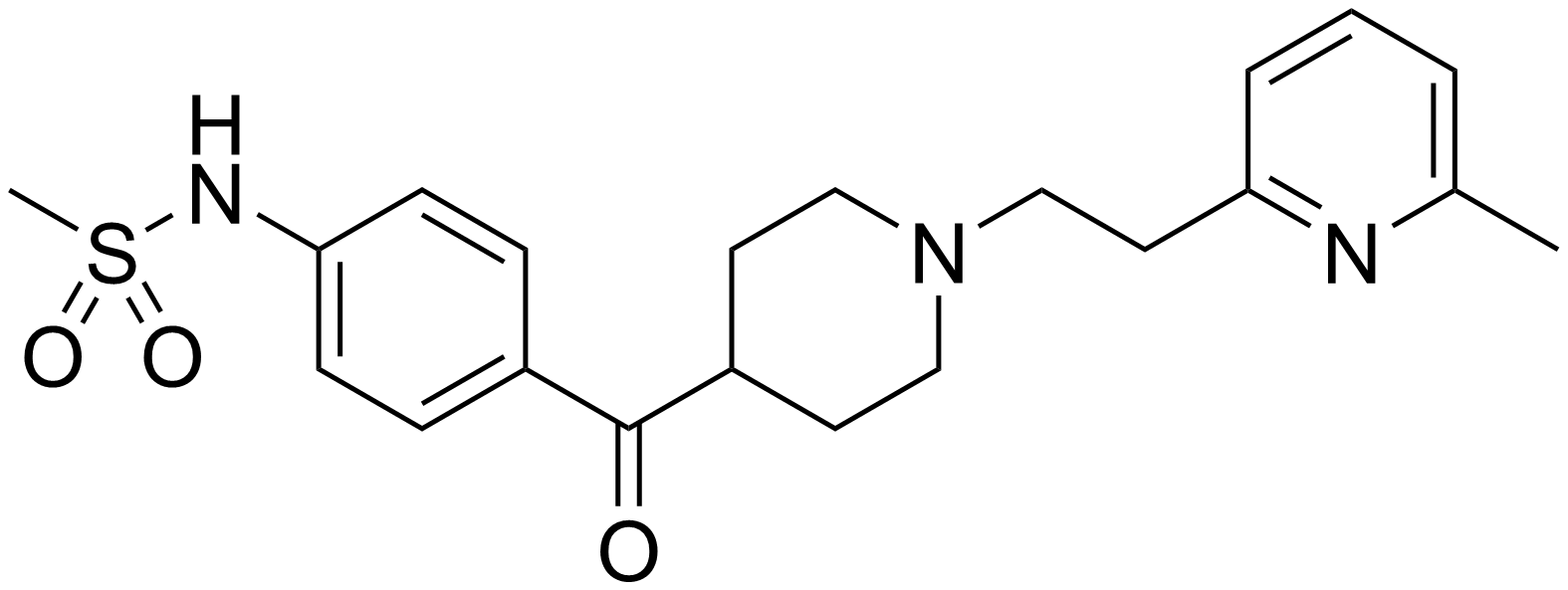

Clinical data
- Other names: (1-[2-(6-methyl-2-pyridyl)ethyl]-4-(4-methylsulfonyl-aminobenzoyl)piperidine)

Identifiers
- IUPAC name: N-[4-[1-[2-(6-Methylpyridin-2-yl)ethyl]piperidine-4-carbonyl]phenyl]
- CAS Number: 113558-89-7 113559-13-0 (dihydrochloride)
- PubChem CID: 3185
- IUPHAR/BPS: 2605
- ChemSpider: 3073
- UNII: 1L1K8X5DF9
- ChEMBL: ChEMBL327980
- CompTox Dashboard (EPA): DTXSID00150458

Chemical and physical data
- Formula: C_{21}H_{27}N_{3}O_{3}S
- Molar mass: 401.53 g·mol^{−1}
- 3D model (JSmol): Interactive image
- SMILES: Cc1cccc(n1)CCN2CCC(CC2)C(=O)c3ccc(cc3)NS(=O)(=O)C
- InChI: InChI=1S/C21H27N3O3S/c1-16-4-3-5-19(22-16)12-15-24-13-10-18(11-14-24)21(25)17-6-8-20(9-7-17)23-28(2,26)27/h3-9,18,23H,10-15H2,1-2H3; Key:SRUISGSHWFJION-UHFFFAOYSA-N

E-4031 is an experimental class III antiarrhythmic drug that blocks potassium channels of the hERG-type.

== Chemistry ==
E-4031 is a synthesized toxin that is a methanesulfonanilide class III antiarrhythmic drug.

== Target ==
E-4031 acts on a specific class of voltage-gated potassium channels mainly found in the heart, the hERG channels. hERG channels (Kv11.1) mediate the I_{Kr} current, which repolarizes the myocardial cells. The hERG channel is encoded by ether-a-go-go related gene (hERG).

== Mode of action ==
E-4031 blocks hERG-type potassium channels by binding to the open channels. Its structural target within the hERG-channel is unclear, but some other methanesulfonanilide class III antiarrhythmic drugs are known to bind to the S6 domain or C-terminal of the hERG-channel.

Reducing I_{Kr} in myocardial cells prolongs the cardiac action potential and thus prolongs the QT-interval. In non-cardiac cells, blocking I_{kr} has a different effect: it increases the frequency of action potentials.

== Toxicity ==
As E-4031 can prolong the QT-interval, it can cause lethal arrhythmias.

== Therapeutic use ==
E-4031 is solely used for research purposes. So far, one clinical trial has been conducted to test the effect of E-4031 on prolongation of the QT-interval.
