= Linopirdine =

Chemical compound

Clinical data
- ATC code: N06BX09 (WHO)

Identifiers
- IUPAC name: 1-phenyl-3,3-bis(pyridin-4-ylmethyl)-1,3-dihydro-2H-indol-2-one
- CAS Number: 105431-72-9
- PubChem CID: 3932
- IUPHAR/BPS: 2599
- ChemSpider: 3795
- UNII: I5TB3NZ94T
- KEGG: D04741
- ChEMBL: ChEMBL319111
- CompTox Dashboard (EPA): DTXSID6045163

Chemical and physical data
- Formula: C_{26}H_{21}N_{3}O
- Molar mass: 391.474 g·mol^{−1}
- 3D model (JSmol): Interactive image
- SMILES: O=C2N(c1ccccc1C2(Cc3ccncc3)Cc4ccncc4)c5ccccc5
- InChI: InChI=1S/C26H21N3O/c30-25-26(18-20-10-14-27-15-11-20,19-21-12-16-28-17-13-21)23-8-4-5-9-24(23)29(25)22-6-2-1-3-7-22/h1-17H,18-19H2; Key:YEJCDKJIEMIWRQ-UHFFFAOYSA-N

Linopirdine is a putative cognition-enhancing drug with a novel mechanism of action. Linopirdine blocks the KCNQ2\3 heteromer M current with an IC50 of 2.4 micromolar disinhibiting acetylcholine release, and increasing hippocampal CA3-schaffer collateral mediated glutamate release onto CA1 pyramidal neurons. In a murine model linopirdine is able to nearly completely reverse the senescence-related decline in cortical c-FOS, an effect which is blocked by atropine and MK-801, suggesting Linopirdine can compensate for the age related decline in acetylcholine release. Linopirdine also blocks homomeric KCNQ1 and KCNQ4 voltage gated potassium channels which contribute to vascular tone with substantially less selectivity than KCNQ2/3. Linopirdine also acts as a glycine receptor antagonist in concentrations typical for Kv7 studies in the brain.

== Synthesis ==
Linopirdine synthesis: ~90%: Patents ~90%:

The amide formation between diphenylamine (1) and oxalyl chloride [79-37-8] gives intermediate, CID:11594101 (2). Haworth type intramolecular cyclization of the acid chloride occurs on heating to afford 1-phenylisatin [723-89-7] (3). The reaction with 4-picoline (4) under PTC with a Quat. salt afforded the carbinol, CID:10358387 (5). Dehydration of the alcohol using acetic anhydride gives [33546-08-6] (6). The reduction of the olefin then afforded the indolone, CID:10470081 (7). The 3 position is now activated by the adjacent benzene ring on one side and the carbonyl group on the other. Alkylation with 4-picolylchloride [10445-91-7] (8) proceeds with hydroxide as the base to afford Linopirdine (9).
