= Antiarrhythmic agent =

Heart rhythm medication

Antiarrhythmic agents
- Drug class
- Skeletal formula of amiodarone, a common antiarrhythmic.

Class identifiers
- Synonyms: antiarrhythmics, cardiac dysrhythmia medications
- Use: Arrhythmia, Atrial fibrillation, Ventricular tachycardia, etc.
- ATC code: C01B
- Biological target: Cardiac ion channels

Clinical data
- Drugs.com: Drug Classes

External links
- MeSH: D000889

Legal status

Antiarrhythmic agents, also known as cardiac dysrhythmia medications, are a class of drugs that are used to suppress abnormal heart rhythms, such as atrial fibrillation, supraventricular tachycardia and ventricular tachycardia.

Many attempts have been made to classify antiarrhythmic agents. Many of the antiarrhythmic agents have multiple modes of action, which makes any classification imprecise.

== Action potential ==
Drugs affecting the cardiac action potential

The cardiac myocyte has two general types of action potentials: conduction system and working myocardium. The action potential is divided into 5 phases and shown in the diagram. The sharp rise in voltage ("0") corresponds to the influx of sodium ions, whereas the two decays ("1" and "3", respectively) correspond to the sodium-channel inactivation and the repolarizing efflux of potassium ions. The characteristic plateau ("2") results from the opening of voltage-sensitive calcium channels. Each phase utilizes different channels and it is useful to compare these phases to the most common classification system — Vaughan Williams — described below.

== Vaughan Williams classification ==
The Vaughan Williams classification was introduced in 1970 by Miles Vaughan Williams.

Vaughan Williams was a pharmacology tutor at Hertford College, Oxford. One of his students, Bramah N. Singh, contributed to the development of the classification system. The system is therefore sometimes known as the Singh-Vaughan Williams classification.

The five main classes in the Vaughan Williams classification of antiarrhythmic agents are:

- Class I agents interfere with the sodium (Na^{+}) channel.
- Class II agents are anti-sympathetic nervous system agents. Most agents in this class are beta blockers.
- Class III agents affect potassium (K^{+}) efflux.
- Class IV agents affect calcium channels and the AV node.
- Class V agents work by other or unknown mechanisms.

With regard to management of atrial fibrillation, classes I and III are used in rhythm control as medical cardioversion agents, while classes II and IV are used as rate-control agents.

Class	Known as	Examples	Mechanism	Medical uses
Ia	Fast sodium channel blockers	Ajmaline; Disopyramide; Procainamide; Quinidine; Sparteine	Na^{+} channel block (intermediate association/dissociation) and K+ channel blocking effect. Class Ia drugs prolong the action potential and has an intermediate effect on the 0 phase of depolarization.	Increase QT interval; Prevent paroxysmal recurrent atrial fibrillation triggered by vagal overactivity; Treat ventricular arrhythmia; Treat Wolff-Parkinson-White syndrome (procainamide with caution)
Ib		Lidocaine; Mexiletine; Phenytoin; Tocainide	Na^{+} channel block (fast association/dissociation). Class Ib drugs shorten the action potential of myocardial cell and has a weak effect on the initiation of phase 0 of depolarization	Treat and prevent ventricular arrhythmia during and immediately after myocardial infarction, though this is now discouraged given the increased risk of asystole
Ic		Encainide; Ethacizine; Flecainide; Moricizine; Propafenone	Na^{+} channel block (slow association/dissociation). Class Ic drugs do not affect action potential duration and have the strongest effect on the initiation phase 0 of depolarization	Contraindicated immediately after myocardial infarction; Prevent paroxysmal atrial fibrillation; Treat recurrent tachycardia associated with abnormal conduction pathways, such as Wolff–Parkinson–White syndrome
II	Beta-blockers	Atenolol; Bisoprolol; Carvedilol; Esmolol; Metoprolol; Nebivolol; Propranolol; Timolol	Beta blocker Propranolol also has some sodium channel-blocking effect.	Decrease mortality in patients with myocardial infarction; Prevent recurrence of tachycardia
III	Potassium channel blockers	Amiodarone; Dofetilide; Dronedarone; E-4031; Ibutilide; Sotalol; Vernakalant	K^{+} channel blocker Sotalol is also a beta blocker Amiodarone has mostly Class III activity, but also I, II, & IV activity	Prevent paroxysmal atrial fibrillation and haemodynamically stable ventricular tachycardia (amiodarone); Treat atrial flutter and atrial fibrillation (ibutilide); Treat ventricular tachycardia and atrial fibrillation (sotalol); Treat Wolff-Parkinson-White syndrome
IV	Calcium channel blockers	Diltiazem; Verapamil	Ca^{2+} channel blocker	Prevent recurrence of paroxysmal supraventricular tachycardia; Reduce ventricular rate in patients with atrial fibrillation
V		Adenosine; Digoxin; Magnesium sulfate	Work by other or unknown mechanisms	Contraindicated in ventricular arrhythmias; Adenosine is used to treat supraventricular tachycardias, especially in heart failure and atrial fibrillation; Magnesium sulfate is used to treat torsades de pointes, a type of arrhythmia

=== Class I agents ===
The class I antiarrhythmic agents interfere with the sodium channel. Class I agents are grouped by what effect they have on the Na^{+} channel, and what effect they have on cardiac action potentials.

Class I agents are called membrane-stabilizing agents, "stabilizing" referring to the decrease of excitogenicity of the plasma membrane which is brought about by these agents. (Also noteworthy is that a few class II agents like propranolol also have a membrane stabilizing effect.)

Class I agents are divided into three groups (Ia, Ib, and Ic) based upon their effect on the length of the action potential.

- Class Ia drugs lengthen the action potential (right shift)
- Class Ib drugs shorten the action potential (left shift)
- Class Ic drugs do not significantly affect the action potential (no shift)
Class Ia

Class Ib

Class Ic

=== Class II agents ===
Class II agents are conventional beta blockers. They act by blocking the effects of catecholamines at the β_{1}-adrenergic receptors, thereby decreasing sympathetic activity on the heart, which reduces intracellular cAMP levels and hence reduces Ca^{2+} influx. These agents are particularly useful in the treatment of supraventricular tachycardias. They decrease conduction through the AV node.

Class II agents include atenolol, esmolol, propranolol, and metoprolol.

=== Class III agents ===
Effect of class III drugs on length of action potential

Class III agents predominantly block the potassium channels, thereby prolonging repolarization. Since these agents do not affect the sodium channel, conduction velocity is not decreased. The prolongation of the action potential duration and refractory period, combined with the maintenance of normal conduction velocity, prevent re-entrant arrhythmias. (The re-entrant rhythm is less likely to interact with tissue that has become refractory). The class III agents exhibit reverse-use dependence (their potency increases with slower heart rates, and therefore improves maintenance of sinus rhythm). Inhibiting potassium channels results in slowed atrial-ventricular myocyte repolarization. Class III agents have the potential to prolong the QT interval of the EKG, and may be proarrhythmic (more associated with development of polymorphic VT).

Class III agents include: bretylium, amiodarone, ibutilide, sotalol, dofetilide, vernakalant, and dronedarone.

=== Class IV agents ===
Class IV agents are slow non-dihydropyridine calcium channel blockers. They decrease conduction through the AV node, and shorten phase two (the plateau) of the cardiac action potential. They thus reduce the contractility of the heart, so may be inappropriate in heart failure. However, in contrast to beta blockers, they allow the body to retain adrenergic control of heart rate and contractility.

Class IV agents include verapamil and diltiazem.

=== Class V and others ===
Since the development of the original Vaughan Williams classification system, additional agents have been used that do not fit cleanly into categories I through IV. Such agents include:

- Adenosine is used intravenously for terminating supraventricular tachycardias.
- Digoxin decreases conduction of electrical impulses through the AV node and increases vagal activity via its action on the central nervous system. Via indirect action, it leads to an increase in acetylcholine production, stimulating M2 receptors on AV node leading to an overall decrease in speed of conduction.
- Magnesium sulfate is an antiarrhythmic drug, but only used against very specific arrhythmias such as torsades de pointes.

=== History ===
The initial classification system had 4 classes, although their definitions different from the modern classification. Those proposed in 1970 were:

1. Drugs with a direct membrane action: the prototype was quinidine, and lignocaine was a key example. Differing from other authors, Vaughan-Williams describe the main action as a slowing of the rising phase of the action potential.
2. Sympatholytic drugs (drugs blocking the effects of the sympathetic nervous system): examples included bretylium and adrenergic beta-receptors blocking drugs. This is similar to the modern classification, which focuses on the latter category.
3. Compounds that prolong the action potential: matching the modern classification, with the key drug example being amiodarone, and a surgical example being thyroidectomy. This was not a defining characteristic in an earlier review by Charlier et al. (1968), but was supported by experimental data presented by Vaughan Williams (1970). The figure illustrating these findings was also published in the same year by Singh and Vaughan Williams.
4. Drugs acting like diphenylhydantoin (DPH): mechanism of action unknown, but others had attributed its cardiac action to an indirect action on the brain; this drug is better known as antiepileptic drug phenytoin.

== Sicilian gambit classification ==
Another approach, known as the "Sicilian gambit", placed a greater approach on the underlying mechanism.

It presents the drugs on two axes, instead of one, and is presented in tabular form. On the Y axis, each drug is listed, in roughly the Singh-Vaughan Williams order. On the X axis, the channels, receptors, pumps, and clinical effects are listed for each drug, with the results listed in a grid. It is, therefore, not a true classification in that it does not aggregate drugs into categories.

== Modernized Oxford classification by Lei, Huang, Wu, and Terrar ==
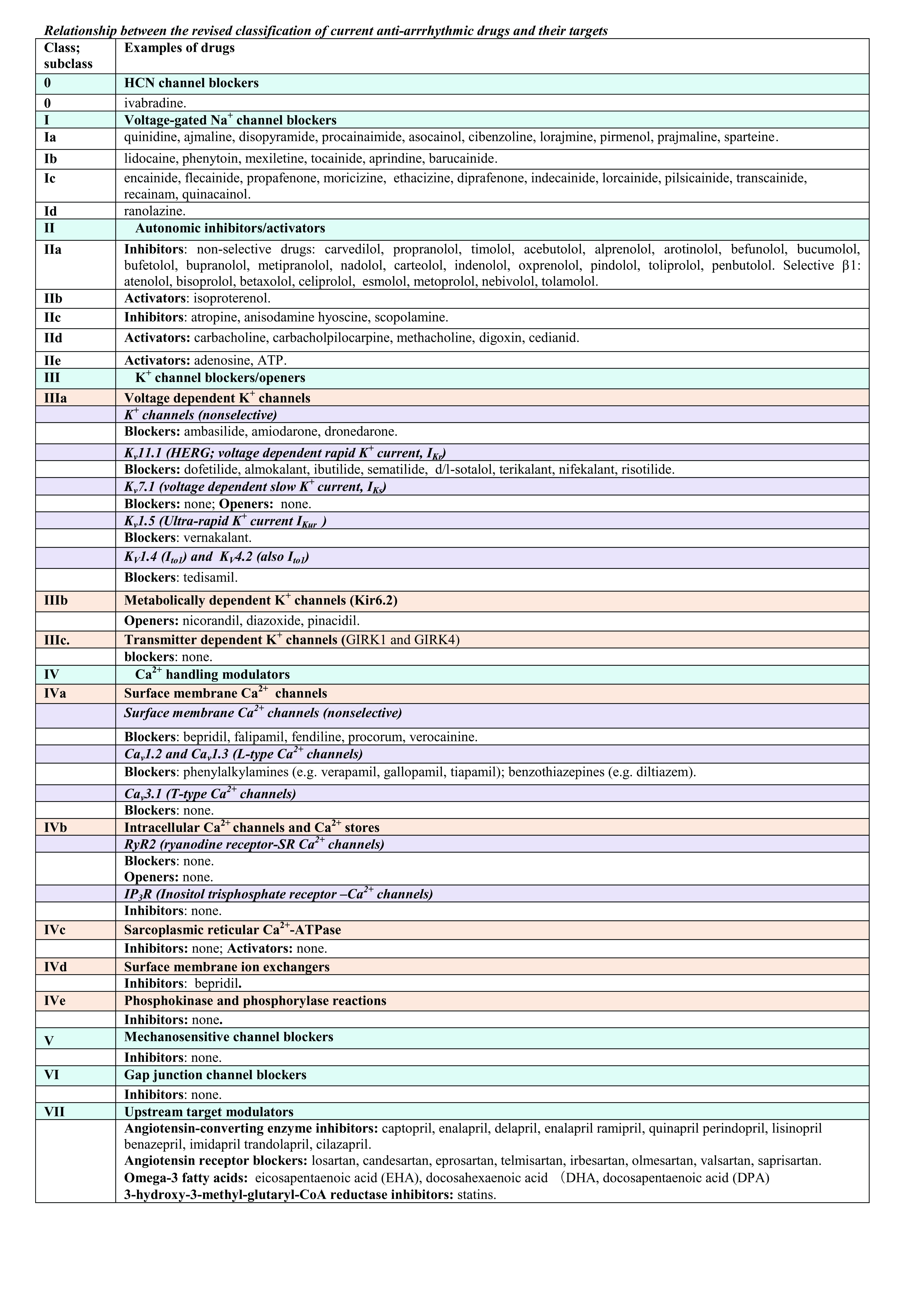
Common anti-arrhythmic drugs under the modernized classification according to Lei et al. 2018

A recent publication (2018) has now emerged with a fully modernised drug classification. This preserves the simplicity of the original Vaughan Williams framework while capturing subsequent discoveries of sarcolemmal, sarcoplasmic reticular and cytosolic biomolecules. The result is an expanded but pragmatic classification that encompasses approved and potential anti-arrhythmic drugs. This will aid our understanding and clinical management of cardiac arrhythmias and facilitate future therapeutic developments. It starts by considering the range of pharmacological targets, and tracks these to their particular cellular electrophysiological effects. It retains but expands the original Vaughan Williams classes I to IV, respectively covering actions on Na+ current components, autonomic signalling, K^{+} channel subspecies, and molecular targets related to Ca^{2+} homeostasis. It now introduces new classes incorporating additional targets, including:

- Class 0: ion channels involved in automaticity
- Class V: mechanically sensitive ion channels
- Class VI: connexins controlling electrotonic cell coupling
- Class VII: molecules underlying longer term signalling processes affecting structural remodeling.

It also allows for multiple drug targets/actions and adverse pro-arrhythmic effects. The new scheme will additionally aid development of novel drugs under development and is illustrated here.

== See also ==
- Antiarrhythmic agents (category)
- Cardiac Arrhythmia Suppression Trial (CAST)
- Electrocardiogram
- Management of atrial fibrillation
- Proarrhythmic agent
