= KCNH2 =

Mammalian protein found in humans

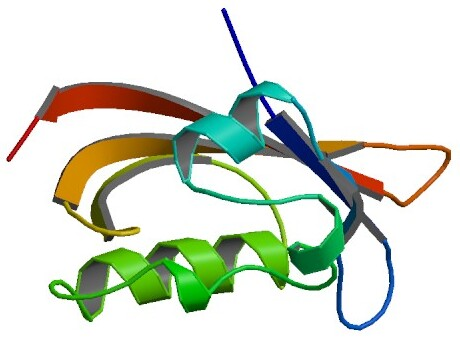

Identifiers
- Aliases: KCNH2, ERG-1, ERG1, H-ERG, HERG, HERG1, Kv11.1, LQT2, SQT1, potassium voltage-gated channel subfamily H member 2
- External IDs: OMIM: 152427; MGI: 1341722; GeneCards: KCNH2
Available structures
PDB	Ortholog search: PDBe RCSB
PDB	List of PDB id codes 1BYW, 1UJL, 2L0W, 2L1M, 2L4R, 2LE7, 4HP9, 4HQA, 2N7G

Gene location (Human)
Chr.	Chromosome 7 (human)
Band	7q36.1	Start	150,944,961 bp
Band	7q36.1	End	150,978,321 bp

Gene location (Mouse)
Chr.	Chromosome 5 (mouse)
Band	5 A3|5 10.94 cM	Start	24,524,587 bp
Band	5 A3|5 10.94 cM	End	24,556,602 bp
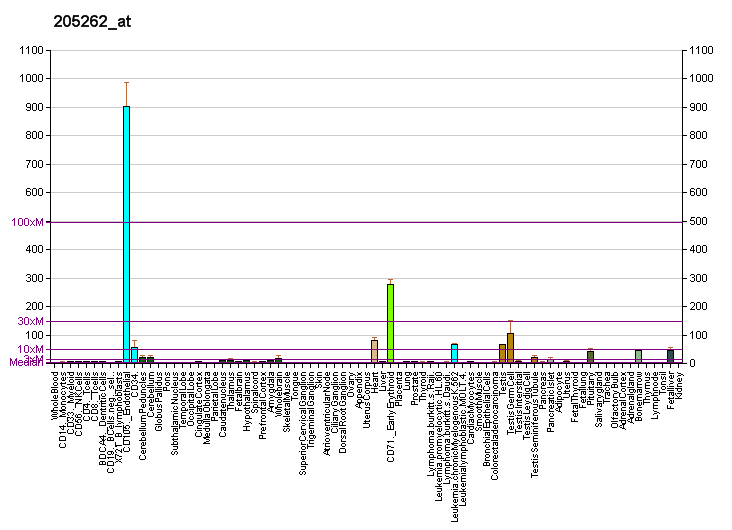

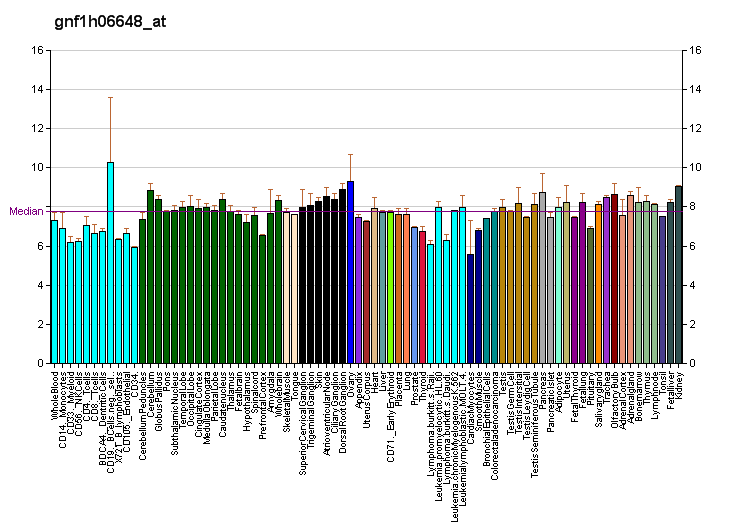

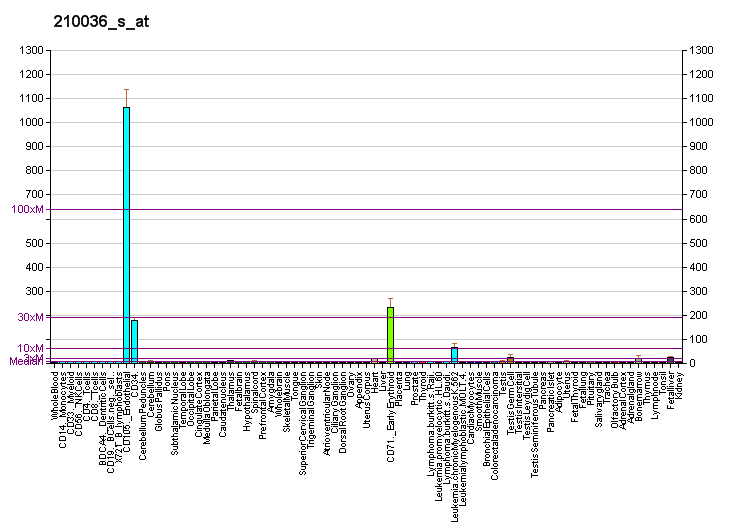
RNA expression pattern
Bgee	Human / Mouse (ortholog); Top expressed in: apex of heart; right auricle of heart; left ventricle; muscle layer of sigmoid colon; right hemisphere of cerebellum; pituitary gland; myocardium of left ventricle; anterior pituitary; right testis; left testis / Top expressed in: choroid plexus of fourth ventricle; neural layer of retina; right ventricle; lens; central gray substance of midbrain; epithelium of lens; medulla oblongata; atrium; interventricular septum; cerebellar cortex; More reference expression data
BioGPS	More reference expression data
Gene ontology
Molecular function	potassium channel activity; protein homodimerization activity; scaffold protein binding; voltage-gated potassium channel activity involved in cardiac muscle cell action potential repolarization; C3HC4-type RING finger domain binding; voltage-gated ion channel activity; ion channel activity; protein binding; identical protein binding; voltage-gated potassium channel activity involved in ventricular cardiac muscle cell action potential repolarization; voltage-gated potassium channel activity; phosphorelay sensor kinase activity; ubiquitin protein ligase binding; delayed rectifier potassium channel activity; inward rectifier potassium channel activity
Cellular component	integral component of membrane; membrane; voltage-gated potassium channel complex; plasma membrane; cell surface; perinuclear region of cytoplasm; inward rectifier potassium channel complex; integral component of plasma membrane
Biological process	membrane depolarization during action potential; cardiac muscle contraction; signal transduction; regulation of membrane potential; regulation of ion transmembrane transport; ventricular cardiac muscle cell action potential; ion transport; potassium ion export across plasma membrane; potassium ion transport; membrane repolarization during action potential; potassium ion homeostasis; regulation of heart rate by hormone; transmembrane transport; potassium ion transmembrane transport; positive regulation of potassium ion transmembrane transport; phosphorelay signal transduction system; regulation of membrane repolarization; negative regulation of potassium ion transmembrane transport; membrane repolarization during cardiac muscle cell action potential; regulation of heart rate by cardiac conduction; regulation of potassium ion transmembrane transport; regulation of ventricular cardiac muscle cell membrane repolarization; membrane repolarization during ventricular cardiac muscle cell action potential; membrane repolarization; negative regulation of potassium ion export across plasma membrane; potassium ion import across plasma membrane; cardiac conduction
Sources:Amigo / QuickGO
Orthologs
Databases	NCBI: entry; OMA: entry
Species	Human	Mouse
Entrez	3757	16511
Ensembl	ENSG00000055118	ENSMUSG00000038319
UniProt	Q12809	O35219
RefSeq (mRNA)	NM_000238; NM_001204798; NM_172056; NM_172057	NM_001294162; NM_013569
RefSeq (protein)	NP_000229; NP_001191727; NP_742053; NP_742054	NP_001281091; NP_038597
Location (UCSC)	Chr 7: 150.94 – 150.98 Mb	Chr 5: 24.52 – 24.56 Mb
PubMed search
- Wikidata
View/Edit Human	View/Edit Mouse

Voltage-gated inwardly rectifying potassium channel KCNH2 also known as hERG (the human Ether-à-go-go-Related Gene) is a protein encoded by the gene KCNH2 K_{v}11.1, the α subunit of a potassium ion channel. This ion channel is best known for its contribution to the electrical activity of the heart: the hERG channel mediates the repolarizing I_{Kr} current in the cardiac action potential, which helps coordinate the heart's beating.

When this channel's ability to conduct electrical current across the cell membrane is inhibited or compromised, either by application of drugs or by rare mutations in some families, it can result in a potentially fatal disorder called long QT syndrome. Conversely, genetic mutations that increase the current through these channels can lead to the related inherited heart rhythm disorder short QT syndrome. A number of clinically successful drugs in the market have had the tendency to inhibit hERG, lengthening the QT and potentially leading to a fatal irregularity of the heartbeat (a ventricular tachyarrhythmia called torsades de pointes). This has made hERG inhibition an important antitarget that must be avoided during drug development.

hERG has also been associated with modulating the functions of some cells of the nervous system and with establishing and maintaining cancer-like features in leukemic cells.

== Function ==
hERG forms the major portion of one of the ion channel proteins (the 'rapid' delayed rectifier current (I_{Kr})) that conducts potassium (K^{+}) ions out of the muscle cells of the heart (cardiac myocytes), and this current is critical in correctly timing the return to the resting state (repolarization) of the cell membrane during the cardiac action potential. Sometimes, when referring to the pharmacological effects of drugs, the terms "hERG channels" and I_{Kr} are used interchangeably, but, in the technical sense, "hERG channels" can be made only by scientists in the laboratory; in formal terms, the naturally occurring channels in the body that include hERG are referred to by the name of the electrical current that has been measured in that cell type, so, for example, in the heart, the correct name is I_{Kr}. This difference in nomenclature becomes clearer in the controversy as to whether the channels conducting I_{Kr} include other subunits (e.g., β subunits) or whether the channels include a mixture of different types (isoforms) of hERG, but, when the originally-discovered form of hERG is experimentally transferred into cells that previously lacked hERG (i.e., heterologous expression), a potassium ion channel is formed, and this channel has many signature features of the cardiac 'rapid' delayed rectifier current (I_{Kr}), including I_{Kr}'s inward rectification that results in the channel producing a 'paradoxical resurgent current' in response to repolarization of the membrane.

== Structure ==
A detailed atomic structure for hERG based on X-ray crystallography is not yet available, but structures have recently been solved by electron microscopy. In the laboratory the heterologously expressed hERG potassium channel comprises four identical α subunits, which form the channel's pore through the plasma membrane. Each hERG subunit consists of 6 transmembrane α-helices, numbered S1–S6, a pore helix situated between S5 and S6, and cytoplasmically located N- and C-termini. The S4 helix contains a positively charged arginine or lysine amino acid residue at every 3rd position and is thought to act as a voltage-sensitive sensor, which allows the channel to respond to voltage changes by changing conformations between conducting and non-conducting states (called 'gating'). Between the S5 and S6 helices, there is an extracellular loop (known as 'the turret') and 'the pore loop', which begins and ends extracellularly but loops into the plasma membrane; the pore loop for each of the hERG subunits in one channel faces into the ion-conducting pore and is adjacent to the corresponding loops of the three other subunits, and together they form the selectivity filter region of the channel pore. The selectivity sequence, SVGFG, is very similar to that contained in bacterial KcsA channels. Although a full crystal structure for hERG is not yet available, a structure has been found for the cytoplasmic N-terminus, which was shown to contain a PAS domain (aminoacid 26–135) that slows the rate of deactivation.

== Genetics ==
Loss-of-function mutations in this channel may lead to long QT syndrome (LQT2), while gain-of-function mutations may lead to short QT syndrome. Both clinical disorders stem from ion channel dysfunction (so-called channelopathies) that can lead to the risk of potentially fatal cardiac arrhythmias (e.g., torsades de pointes), due to repolarization disturbances of the cardiac action potential. There are far more hERG mutations described for long QT syndrome than for short QT syndrome.

== Drug interactions ==
This channel is also sensitive to drug binding, as well as decreased extracellular potassium levels, both of which can result in decreased channel function and drug-induced (acquired) long QT syndrome. Among the drugs that can cause QT prolongation, the more common ones include antiarrhythmics (especially Class 1A and Class III), anti-psychotic agents, and certain antibiotics (including quinolones and macrolides).

Although there exist other potential targets for cardiac adverse effects, the vast majority of drugs associated with acquired QT prolongation are known to interact with the hERG potassium channel. One of the main reasons for this phenomenon is the larger inner vestibule of the hERG channel, thus providing more space for many different drug classes to bind and block this potassium channel.

hERG containing channels are blocked by amiodarone, and it does prolong the QT interval, but its multiple other antiarrhythmic effects prevent this from causing torsades de pointes.

Thioridazine causes peculiarly severe QTc prolongation by blocking hERG and was withdrawn by the manufacturer for this reason.

== Drug development considerations ==
Due to the documented potential of QT-interval-prolonging drugs, the United States Food and Drug Administration issued recommendations for the establishment of a cardiac safety profile during pre-clinical drug development: ICH S7B. The nonclinical evaluation of the potential for delayed ventricular repolarization (QT interval prolongation) by human pharmaceuticals, issued as CHMP/ICH/423/02, adopted by CHMP in May 2005. Preclinical hERG studies should be accomplished in GLP environment.

== Naming ==
The hERG gene was first named and described in a paper by Jeff Warmke and Barry Ganetzky, then both at the University of Wisconsin–Madison. The hERG gene is the human homolog of the Ether-à-go-go gene found in the Drosophila fly; Ether-à-go-go was named in the 1960s by William D. Kaplan and William E. Trout, III, while at the City of Hope Hospital in Duarte, California. When flies with mutations in the Ether-à-go-go gene are anaesthetised with ether, their legs start to shake, like the dancing at the then popular Whisky a Go Go nightclub in West Hollywood, California.

== Interactions ==
hERG has been shown to interact with the 14-3-3 epsilon protein, encoded by YWHAE.

== Inhibitors ==
- Astemizole
- Domperidone
- Sertindole
- Terfenadine
- Vanoxerine (GBR-12909)
- Gigactonine

== See also ==
- Voltage-gated potassium channel
