= Nitrate =

Polyatomic ion (NO3, charge –1) found in explosives and fertilisers

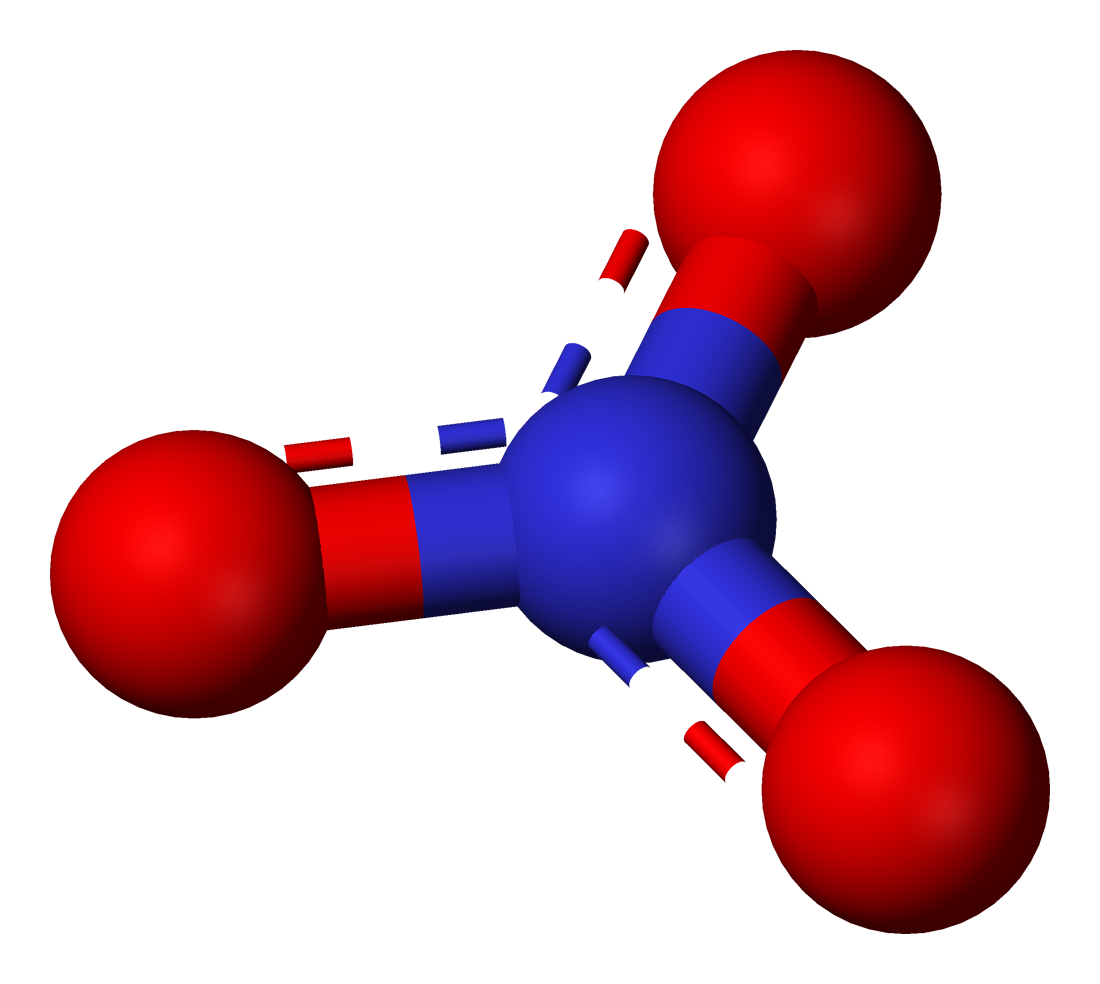

Names
- Systematic IUPAC name Nitrate

Identifiers
CAS Number	14797-55-8
3D model (JSmol)	Interactive image
ChEBI	CHEBI:17632
ChemSpider	918
PubChem CID	943
UNII	T93E9Y2844
- InChI: InChI=1S/NO3/c2-1(3)4/q-1 Key: NHNBFGGVMKEFGY-UHFFFAOYSA-N; InChI=1/NO3/c2-1(3)4/q-1 Key: NHNBFGGVMKEFGY-UHFFFAOYAI
- SMILES: [N+](=O)([O-])[O-]

Properties
Chemical formula	NO_{3}^{−}
Molar mass	62.004 g·mol^{−1}
Conjugate acid	Nitric acid
- Except where otherwise noted, data are given for materials in their standard state (at 25 °C [77 °F], 100 kPa). Infobox references

Nitrate is a polyatomic ion with the chemical formula NO_{3}^{−}. Salts containing this ion are called nitrates. Nitrates are common components of fertilizers and explosives. Almost all inorganic nitrates are soluble in water. An example of an insoluble (inorganic) nitrate is bismuth oxynitrate.

In nature, nitrates are produced by a number of species of nitrifying bacteria in the natural environment using ammonia or urea as a source of nitrogen and source of free energy. Nitrate compounds for gunpowder were historically produced, in the absence of mineral nitrate sources, by means of various fermentation processes using urine and dung. Modern nitrate production is mostly focused on creation for fertilizer and chemical manufacturing for various applications, such as medicine synthesis, ceramics and preservation of meat. Annually, about 195 million metric tons of synthetic nitrogen fertilizers are used worldwide, with nitrates constituting a significant portion of this amount.

Because nitrates are soluble and easily can be swept away from the soil because of precipitation, excessive agricultural use has been associated with nutrient runoff, water pollution, and the proliferation of aquatic dead zones. Direct exposure of nitrates for humans can have direct health consequences: the excess consumption of nitrates in cured meats is associated with intestinal cancers.

== Chemical structure ==
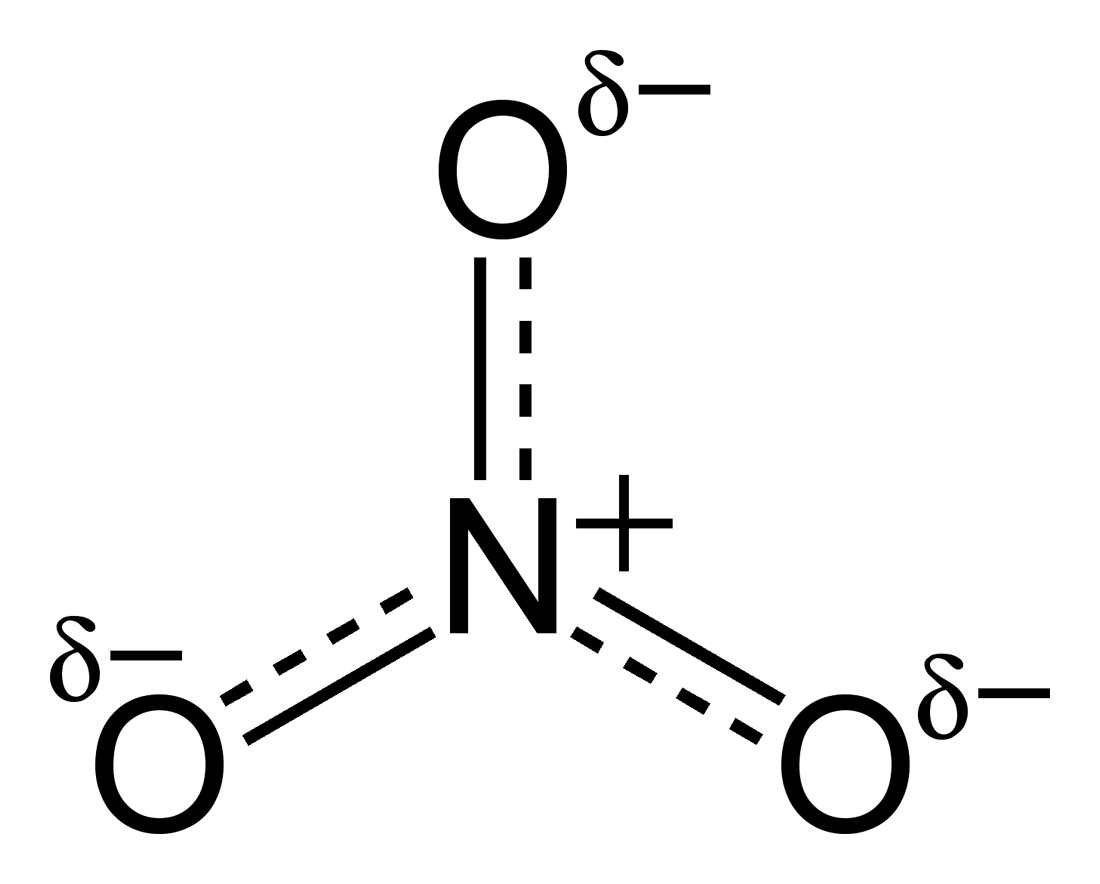
The nitrate ion with the partial charges shown

The nitrate anion is the conjugate base of nitric acid, consisting of one central nitrogen atom surrounded by three identically bonded oxygen atoms in a trigonal planar arrangement. The nitrate ion carries a formal charge of −1. This charge results from a combination formal charge in which each of the three oxygens carries a −2/3 charge, whereas the nitrogen carries a +1 charge, all these adding up to formal charge of the polyatomic nitrate ion. This arrangement is commonly used as an example of resonance. Like the isoelectronic carbonate ion, the nitrate ion can be represented by three resonance structures:

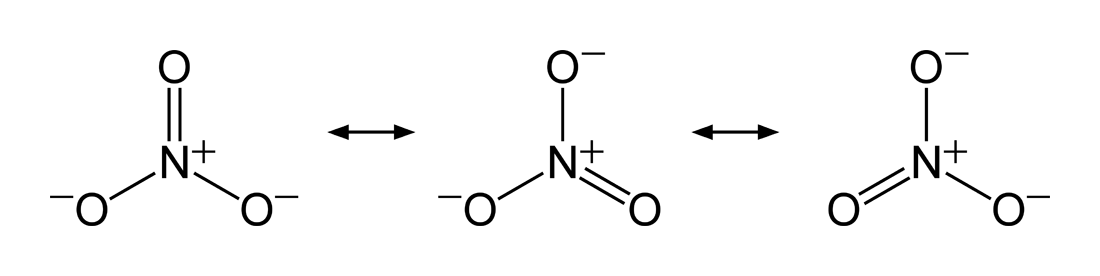
Canonical resonance structures for the nitrate ion

== Chemical and biochemical properties ==
In the NO_{3}^{−} anion, the oxidation state of the central nitrogen atom is V (+5). This corresponds to the highest possible oxidation number of nitrogen. Nitrate is a potentially powerful oxidizer as evidenced by its explosive behaviour at high temperature when it is detonated in ammonium nitrate (NH_{4}NO_{3}), or black powder, ignited by the shock wave of a primary explosive. In contrast to red fuming nitric acid (HNO_{3}/N_{2}O_{4}), or concentrated nitric acid (HNO_{3}), nitrate in aqueous solution at neutral or high pH is only a weak oxidizing agent in redox reactions in which the reductant does not produce hydrogen ions (such as mercury going to calomel). However, it is still a strong oxidizer when the reductant does produce hydrogen ions, such as in the oxidation of hydrogen itself. Nitrate is stable in the absence of microorganisms, or reductants such as organic matter. In fact, nitrogen gas is thermodynamically stable in the presence of 1 atm of oxygen only in very acidic conditions, and otherwise would combine with it to form nitrate. This is shown by subtracting the two oxidation reactions:

N_{2} + 6 H_{2}O → 2 NO_{3}^{−} + 12 H^{+} + 10 e^{−} $\qquad E_0 = 1.246-0.0709 \text{ pH } + \frac {0.0591} {10} \log\frac{[\mathrm{NO_3^-}]^2}{P_{\mathrm{N_2}}}$

2 H_{2}O → O_{2} + 4 H^{+} + 4 e^{−} $\qquad\qquad\qquad E_0 = 1.228-0.0591 \text{ pH } + \frac {0.0591} 4 \log{P_{\mathrm{O_2}}}$

giving:

2 N_{2} + 5 O_{2} + 2 H_{2}O → 4 NO_{3}^{−} + 4 H^{+} $\qquad0=0.018-0.0118 \text{ pH } + \frac {0.0591} {10} \log\frac{[\mathrm{NO_3^-}]^2}{P_{\mathrm{N_2}}}-\frac {0.0591} 4 \log{P_{\mathrm{O_2}}}$

Dividing by 0.0118 and rearranging gives the equilibrium relation:

$$\log\frac{[\mathrm{NO_3^-}]}{P_{\mathrm{N_2}}^{1/2}P_{\mathrm{O_2}}^{5/4}}=\text{ pH }-1.5$$

However, in reality, nitrogen, oxygen, and water do not combine directly to form nitrate. Rather, a reductant such as hydrogen reacts with nitrogen to produce "fixed nitrogen" such as ammonia, which is then oxidized, eventually becoming nitrate. Nitrate does not accumulate to high levels in nature because it reacts with reductants in the process called denitrification (see Nitrogen cycle).

Nitrate is used as a powerful terminal electron acceptor by denitrifying bacteria to deliver the energy they need to thrive. Under anaerobic conditions, nitrate is the strongest electron acceptor used by prokaryote microorganisms (bacteria and archaea) to respirate. The redox couple NO_{3}^{−}/N_{2} is at the top of the redox scale for the anaerobic respiration, just below the couple oxygen (O_{2}/H_{2}O), but above the couples Mn(IV)/Mn(II), Fe(III)/Fe(II), SO_{4}^{2−}/HS^{−}, CO_{2}/CH_{4}. In natural waters inhabited by microorganisms, nitrate is a quite unstable and labile dissolved chemical species because it is metabolised by denitrifying bacteria. Water samples for nitrate/nitrite analyses need to be kept at 4 °C in a refrigerated room and analysed as quickly as possible to limit the loss of nitrate.

In the first step of the denitrification process, dissolved nitrate (NO_{3}^{−}) is catalytically reduced into nitrite (NO_{2}^{−}) by the enzymatic activity of bacteria. In aqueous solution, dissolved nitrite, N(III), is a more powerful oxidizer that nitrate, N(V), because it has to accept less electrons and its reduction is less kinetically hindered than that of nitrate.

Electrochemical reduction of nitrate is also well-known, although its use for energy storage and denitrification remains underdeveloped.

During the biological denitrification process, further nitrite reduction also gives rise to another powerful oxidizing agent: nitric oxide (NO). NO can fix on myoglobin, accentuating its red coloration. NO is an important biological signaling molecule and intervenes in the vasodilation process. Still, it can also produce free radicals in biological tissues, accelerating their degradation and aging process. The reactive oxygen species (ROS) generated by NO contribute to the oxidative stress, a condition involved in vascular dysfunction and atherogenesis.

== Detection in chemical analysis ==
The nitrate anion is commonly analysed in water by ion chromatography (IC) along with other anions also present in the solution. The main advantage of IC is its ease and the simultaneous analysis of all the anions present in the aqueous sample. Since the emergence of IC instruments in the 1980s, this separation technique, coupled with many detectors, has become commonplace in the chemical analysis laboratory and is the preferred and most widely used method for nitrate and nitrite analyses.

Previously, nitrate determination relied on spectrophotometric and colorimetric measurements after a specific reagent is added to the solution to reveal a characteristic color (often red because it absorbs visible light in the blue). Because of interferences with the brown color of dissolved organic matter (DOM: humic and fulvic acids) often present in soil pore water, artefacts can easily affect the absorbance values. In case of weak interference, a blank measurement with only a naturally brown-colored water sample can be sufficient to subtract the undesired background from the measured sample absorbance. If the DOM brown color is too intense, the water samples must be pretreated, and inorganic nitrogen species must be separated before measurement. Meanwhile, for clear water samples, colorimetric instruments retain the advantage of being less expensive and sometimes portable, making them an affordable option for fast routine controls or field measurements.

Colorimetric methods for the specific detection of nitrate (NO_{3}^{−}) often rely on its conversion to nitrite (NO_{2}^{−}) followed by nitrite-specific tests. The reduction of nitrate to nitrite can be effected by a copper-cadmium alloy, metallic zinc, or hydrazine. The most popular of these assays is the Griess test, whereby nitrite is converted to a deeply red colored azo dye suited for UV–vis spectrophotometry analysis. The method exploits the reactivity of nitrous acid (HNO_{2}) derived from the acidification of nitrite. Nitrous acid selectively reacts with aromatic amines to give diazonium salts, which in turn couple with a second reagent to give the azo dye. The detection limit is 0.02 to 2 μM. Such methods have been highly adapted to biological samples and soil samples.

In the dimethylphenol method, 1 mL of concentrated sulfuric acid (H_{2}SO_{4}) is added to 200 μL of the solution being tested for nitrate. Under strongly acidic conditions, nitrate ions react with 2,6-dimethylphenol, forming a yellow compound, 4-nitro-2,6-dimethylphenol. This occurs through electrophilic aromatic substitution where the intermediate nitronium (NO_{2}^{+}) ions attack the aromatic ring of dimethylphenol. The resulting product (ortho- or para-nitro-dimethylphenol) is analyzed using UV-vis spectrophotometry at 345 nm according to the Lambert-Beer law.

Another colorimetric method based on the chromotropic acid (dihydroxynaphthalene-disulfonic acid) was also developed by West and Lyles in 1960 for the direct spectrophotometric determination of nitrate anions.

If formic acid is added to a mixture of brucine (an alkaloid related to strychnine) and potassium nitrate (KNO_{3}), its color instantly turns red. This reaction has been used for the direct colorimetric detection of nitrates.

For direct online chemical analysis using a flow-through system, the water sample is introduced by a peristaltic pump in a flow injection analyzer, and the nitrate or resulting nitrite-containing effluent is then combined with a reagent for its colorimetric detection.

== Occurrence and production ==
Nitrate salts are found naturally on earth in arid environments as large deposits, particularly of nitratine, a major source of sodium nitrate.

Nitrates are produced by a number of species of nitrifying bacteria in the natural environment using ammonia or urea as a source of nitrogen and source of free energy. Nitrate compounds for gunpowder were historically produced, in the absence of mineral nitrate sources, by means of various fermentation processes using urine and dung.

Lightning strikes in earth's nitrogen- and oxygen-rich atmosphere produce a mixture of oxides of nitrogen, which form nitrous ions and nitrate ions, which are washed from the atmosphere by rain or in occult deposition.

Nitrates are produced industrially from nitric acid.

== Uses ==
=== Agriculture ===
Nitrate is a chemical compound that serves as a primary form of nitrogen for many plants. This essential nutrient is used by plants to synthesize proteins, nucleic acids, and other vital organic molecules. The transformation of atmospheric nitrogen into nitrate is facilitated by certain bacteria and lightning in the nitrogen cycle, which exemplifies nature's ability to convert a relatively inert molecule into a form that is crucial for biological productivity.

Nitrates are used as fertilizers in agriculture because of their high solubility and biodegradability. The main nitrate fertilizers are ammonium, sodium, potassium, calcium, and magnesium salts. Several billion kilograms are produced annually for this purpose. The significance of nitrate extends beyond its role as a nutrient since it acts as a signaling molecule in plants, regulating processes such as root growth, flowering, and leaf development.

While nitrate is beneficial for agriculture since it enhances soil fertility and crop yields, its excessive use can lead to nutrient runoff, water pollution, and the proliferation of aquatic dead zones. Therefore, sustainable agricultural practices that balance productivity with environmental stewardship are necessary. Nitrate's importance in ecosystems is evident since it supports the growth and development of plants, contributing to biodiversity and ecological balance.

=== Firearms ===
Nitrates are used as oxidizing agents, most notably in explosives, where the rapid oxidation of carbon compounds liberates large volumes of gases (see gunpowder as an example).

=== Industrial ===
Sodium nitrate is used to remove air bubbles from molten glass and some ceramics. Mixtures of molten salts are used to harden the surface of some metals.

=== Medicinal and pharmaceutical use ===
In the medical field, nitrate-derived organic esters, such as glyceryl trinitrate, isosorbide dinitrate, and isosorbide mononitrate, are used in the prophylaxis and management of acute coronary syndrome, myocardial infarction, acute pulmonary oedema. This class of drug, to which amyl nitrite also belongs, is known as nitrovasodilators.

== Toxicity and safety ==
The two areas of concerns about the toxicity of nitrate are the following:

- nitrate reduced by the microbial activity of nitrate reducing bacteria is the precursor of nitrite in water and in the lower gastrointestinal tract. Nitrite is a precursor to carcinogenic nitrosamines, and;
- via the formation of nitrite, nitrate is implicated in methemoglobinemia, a disorder of hemoglobin in red blood cells, especially affecting infants and toddlers from ingesting nitrates in drinking water.

=== Methemoglobinemia ===
One of the most common cause of methemoglobinemia in infants is due to the ingestion of nitrates and nitrites through well water or foods.

In fact, nitrates (NO_{3}^{−}), often present at too high concentration in drinkwater, are only the precursor chemical species of nitrites (NO_{2}^{−}), the real culprits of methemoglobinemia. Nitrites produced by the microbial reduction of nitrate (directly in the drinkwater, or after ingestion by the infant's digestive system) are more powerful oxidizers than nitrates and are the chemical agent really responsible for the oxidation of Fe^{2+} into Fe^{3+} in the tetrapyrrole heme of hemoglobin. Indeed, nitrate anions are too weak oxidizers in aqueous solution to be able to directly, or at least sufficiently rapidly, oxidize Fe^{2+} into Fe^{3+}, because of kinetics limitations.

Infants younger than four months are at greater risk given that they drink more water per body weight, they have a lower NADH-cytochrome b5 reductase activity, and they have a higher level of fetal hemoglobin which converts more easily to methemoglobin. Additionally, infants are at an increased risk after an episode of gastroenteritis due to the production of nitrites by bacteria.

However, other causes than nitrates can also affect infants and pregnant women. Indeed, the blue baby syndrome can also be caused by a number of other factors such as the cyanotic heart disease, a congenital heart defect resulting in low levels of oxygen in the blood, or by gastric upset, such as diarrheal infection, protein intolerance, heavy metal toxicity, etc.

=== Drinking water standards ===
Through the Safe Drinking Water Act, the United States Environmental Protection Agency has set a maximum contaminant level of 10 mg/L or 10 ppm of nitrate in drinking water.

An acceptable daily intake (ADI) for nitrate ions was established in the range of 0–3.7 mg (kg body weight)^{−1} day^{−1} by the Joint FAO/WHO Expert Committee on Food Additives (JEFCA).

=== Aquatic toxicity ===
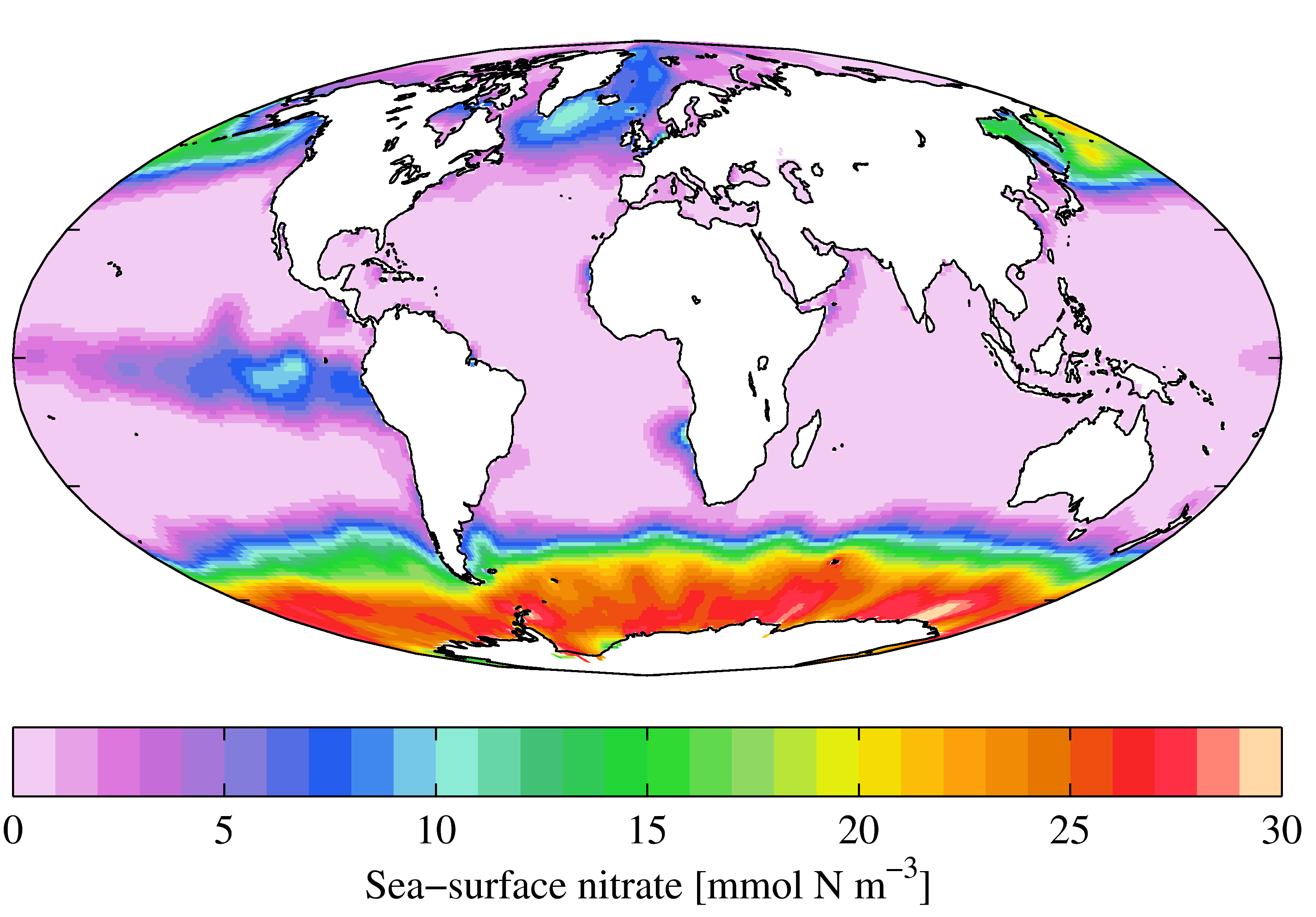
Sea surface nitrate from the World Ocean Atlas

In freshwater or estuarine systems close to land, nitrate can reach concentrations that are lethal to fish. While nitrate is much less toxic than ammonia, levels over 30 ppm of nitrate can inhibit growth, impair the immune system and cause stress in some aquatic species. Nitrate toxicity remains a subject of debate.

In most cases of excess nitrate concentrations in aquatic systems, the primary sources are wastewater discharges, as well as surface runoff from agricultural or landscaped areas that have received excess nitrate fertilizer. The resulting eutrophication and algae blooms result in anoxia and dead zones. As a consequence, as nitrate forms a component of total dissolved solids, they are widely used as an indicator of water quality.

== Human impacts on ecosystems through nitrate deposition ==
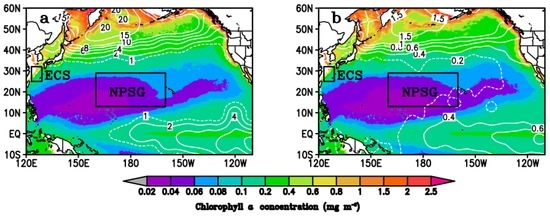
Excessive nitrate and phosphate concentrations measured in the Pacific Ocean

Nitrate deposition into ecosystems has markedly increased due to anthropogenic activities, notably from the widespread application of nitrogen-rich fertilizers in agriculture and the emissions from fossil fuel combustion. Annually, about 195 million metric tons of synthetic nitrogen fertilizers are used worldwide, with nitrates constituting a significant portion of this amount. In regions with intensive agriculture, such as parts of the U.S., China, and India, the use of nitrogen fertilizers can exceed 200 kilograms per hectare.

The impact of increased nitrate deposition extends beyond plant communities to affect soil microbial populations. The change in soil chemistry and nutrient dynamics can disrupt the natural processes of nitrogen fixation, nitrification, and denitrification, leading to altered microbial community structures and functions. This disruption can further impact the nutrient cycling and overall ecosystem health.

== Dietary nitrate ==
A source of nitrate in the human diets arises from the consumption of leafy green foods, such as spinach and arugula. NO_{3}^{−} can be present in beetroot juice. Drinking water represents also a primary nitrate intake source.

Nitrate ingestion rapidly increases the plasma nitrate concentration by a factor of 2 to 3, and this elevated nitrate concentration can be maintained for more than 2 weeks. Increased plasma nitrate enhances the production of nitric oxide, NO. Nitric oxide is a physiological signaling molecule which intervenes in, among other things, regulation of muscle blood flow and mitochondrial respiration.

=== Cured meats ===
Nitrite (NO_{2}^{−}) consumption is primarily determined by the amount of processed meats eaten, and the concentration of nitrates (NO_{3}^{−}) added to these meats (for example, bacon and sausages) for their curing. Although nitrites are the nitrogen species chiefly used in meat curing, nitrates are used as well and can be transformed into nitrite by microorganisms, or in the digestion process, starting by their dissolution in saliva and their contact with the microbiota of the mouth. Nitrites lead to the formation of carcinogenic nitrosamines. The production of nitrosamines may be inhibited by the use of the antioxidants vitamin C and the alpha-tocopherol form of vitamin E during curing.

Many meat processors claim their meats (e.g. bacon) is "uncured" – which is a marketing claim with no factual basis: there is no such thing as "uncured" bacon (as that would be, essentially, raw sliced pork belly). "Uncured" meat is in fact actually cured with nitrites with virtually no distinction in process – the only difference being the USDA labeling requirement between nitrite of vegetable origin (such as from celery) vs. "synthetic" sodium nitrite. An analogy would be purified "sea salt" vs. sodium chloride – both being exactly the same chemical with the only essential difference being the origin.

Anti-hypertensive diets, such as the DASH diet, typically contain high levels of nitrates, which are first reduced to nitrite in the saliva, as detected in saliva testing, prior to forming nitric oxide (NO).

== Domestic animal feed ==
Symptoms of nitrate poisoning in domestic animals include increased heart rate and respiration; in advanced cases blood and tissue may turn a blue or brown color. Feed can be tested for nitrate; treatment consists of supplementing or substituting existing supplies with lower nitrate material. Safe levels of nitrate for various types of livestock are as follows:

Category	%NO_{3}	%NO_{3}–N	%KNO_{3}	Effects
1	< 0.5	< 0.12	< 0.81	Generally safe for beef cattle and sheep
2	0.5–1.0	0.12–0.23	0.81–1.63	Caution: some subclinical symptoms may appear in pregnant horses, sheep and beef cattle
3	1.0	0.23	1.63	High nitrate problems: death losses and abortions can occur in beef cattle and sheep
4	< 1.23	< 0.28	< 2.00	Maximum safe level for horses. Do not feed high nitrate forages to pregnant mares

The values above are on a dry (moisture-free) basis.

== Salts and covalent derivatives ==
Nitrate formation with elements of the periodic table:

== See also ==
- Ammonium
- Eutrophication
- f-ratio in oceanography
- Frost diagram
- Nitrification
- Nitratine
- Nitrite, the anion NO_{2}^{−}
- Nitrogen oxide
- Nitrogen trioxide, the neutral radical NO_{3}
- Peroxynitrate, OONO_{2}^{−}
- Sodium nitrate
