= C15H11ClO2 =

The molecular formula C_{15}H_{11}ClO_{2} (molar mass: 258.70 g/mol) may refer to:

- Cloridarol
- Fluorenylmethyloxycarbonyl chloride (Fmoc-Cl)
