= C18H23NO4 =

The molecular formula C_{18}H_{23}NO_{4} (molar mass: 317.37 g/mol, exact mass: 317.1627 u) may refer to:

- Arbutamine
- Cocaethylene
- Denopamine
- 14-Hydroxydihydrocodeine
