= Trolnitrate =

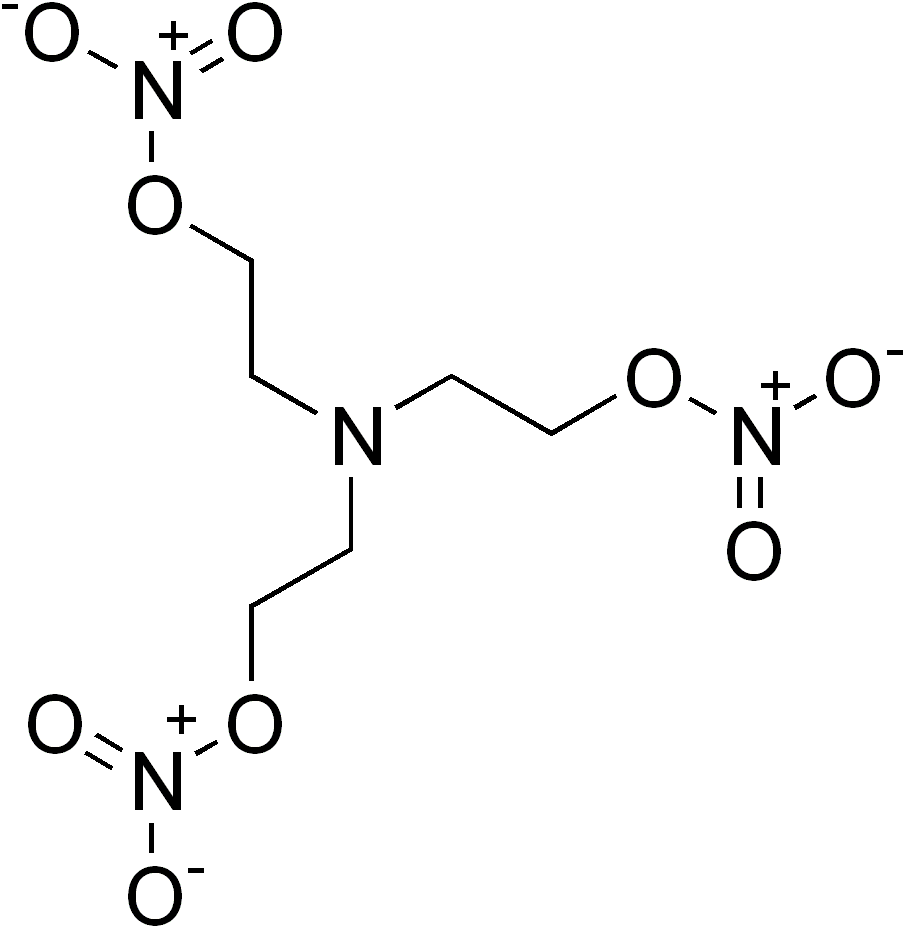

Names
- IUPAC name 2-[bis(2-nitrooxyethyl)amino]ethyl nitrate

Identifiers
CAS Number	7077-34-1
3D model (JSmol)	Interactive image
ChemSpider	11015
ECHA InfoCard	100.027.615
PubChem CID	11499
UNII	B9M85U075P
CompTox Dashboard (EPA)	DTXSID7023722
- InChI: InChI=1S/C6H12N4O9/c11-8(12)17-4-1-7(2-5-18-9(13)14)3-6-19-10(15)16/h1-6H2 Key: HWKQNAWCHQMZHK-UHFFFAOYSA-N
- SMILES: C(CO[N+](=O)[O-])N(CCO[N+](=O)[O-])CCO[N+](=O)[O-]

Properties
Chemical formula	C_{6}H_{12}N_{4}O_{9}
Molar mass	284.18 g/mol

Pharmacology
ATC code	C01DA09 (WHO)
- Except where otherwise noted, data are given for materials in their standard state (at 25 °C [77 °F], 100 kPa). verify (what is ?) Infobox references

Trolnitrate (triethanolamine trinitrate, commonly used in the form of biphosphate salt also known as metamine) is an organic nitrate with vasodilator activity that is used to prevent or ameliorate attacks of angina pectoris. Trolnitrate dilates the coronary vessels because of its basic action as a smooth muscle depressant, just as do nitroglycerin and other organic nitrates.
