= C21H27NO2 =

The molecular formula C_{21}H_{27}NO_{2} (molar mass: 325.44 g/mol) may refer to:

- Etafenone, a vasodilator
- Ifenprodil
- Norpropoxyphene
- SR 59230A
