= Tachyphylaxis =

Rapid and short-term onset of drug tolerance

Tachyphylaxis (from Ancient Greek ταχύς, tachys 'rapid', and φύλαξις, phylaxis 'protection') is a medical term used in pharmacology that describes an acute, sudden decrease in response to a drug after its administration (i.e., a rapid and short-term onset of drug tolerance). It can occur after an initial dose or after a series of small doses. Increasing the dose of the drug may be able to restore the original response.

== Characteristics ==
Tachyphylaxis is characterized by the rate sensitivity: the response of the system depends on the rate with which a stimulus is presented. To be specific, a high-intensity prolonged stimulus or often-repeated stimulus may bring about a diminished response also known as desensitization.

=== Molecular interaction ===
In biological sciences, molecular interactions are the physical bases of the operation of the system. The control of the operation, in general, involves interaction of a stimulus molecule with a receptor/enzyme subsystem by, typically, binding to the macromolecule A and causing an activation or an inhibition of the subsystem by forming an activated form of the macromolecule B. The following schematic represents the activity:

$$A \xrightarrow{\ \ p \ \ } B$$

where p is the activation rate coefficient. It is customary that p is called a rate constant, but, since the p stands for measure of the intensity of the stimulus causing the activation, p may be variable (non-constant).

More complete is an open system, namely, in its simplest form,

$$R \xrightarrow{   } A \xrightarrow{\ \ p(S) \ \ } B \xrightarrow{\ \ q \ \ },$$

where R stands for the rate of production of A, p(S) is the activation rate coefficient explicitly expressing its dependence on the stimulus intensity S and q represents the rate coefficient of removal from the state B. In this elementally open system the steady state of B always equal to R/q.

The above scheme is only the necessary condition for the rate sensitivity phenomenon, and other pathways of deactivation of B may be considered, with the subsequent return to the inactive form of the receptor/enzyme A. Examples offer particular use of such (mathematical) models in endocrinology, physiology and pharmacology.

== Examples ==
=== Psychedelics ===
Psychedelics such as LSD and psilocybin (found in psilocybin-containing mushrooms) demonstrate very rapid tachyphylaxis.

=== Opioids ===
In a patient fully withdrawn from opioids, going back to an intermittent schedule or maintenance dosing protocol, a fraction of the old tolerance level will rapidly develop, usually starting two days after therapy is resumed and, in general, leveling off after day 7. Whether this is caused directly by opioid receptors modified in the past or affecting a change in some metabolic set-point is unclear. Increasing the dose will usually restore efficacy; relatively rapid opioid rotation may also be of use if the increase in tolerance continues.

=== Beta-2 agonists ===
Inhalation of an agonist for the beta-2 adrenergic receptor, such as salbutamol (albuterol — USAN), is the most common treatment for asthma. Polymorphisms of the beta-2 receptor play a role in tachyphylaxis. Expression of the Gly-16 allele (glycine at position 16) results in greater receptor downregulation by endogenous catecholamines at baseline compared to Arg-16. This results in a greater single-use bronchodilator response in individuals homozygous for Arg-16 compared to Gly-16 homozygotes. However, with regular beta-2 agonist use, asthmatic Arg-16 individuals experience a significant decline in bronchodilator response. This decline does not occur in Gly-16 individuals. It has been proposed that the tachyphylactic effect of regular exposure to exogenous beta-2 agonists is more apparent in Arg-16 individuals because their receptors have not been downregulated prior to agonist administration.

=== Nicotine ===
Nicotine may also show tachyphylaxis over the course of a day, although the mechanism of this action is unclear.

=== Methylphenidate ===
Acute tachyphylaxis which does not carry into the next day has been observed in children taking methylphenidate, and inspired the development of OROS methylphenidate.

=== Other examples ===
- Nitroglycerine (or glyceryl trinitrate) and other nitrovasodilators of the nitrate type demonstrates tachyphylaxis, requiring drug-free intervals of 6 to 8 hours.
- Hydralazine displays tachyphylaxis if given as a monotherapy for antihypertensive treatment. It is administered with a beta-blocker with or without a diuretic.
- Metoclopramide
- Dobutamine, a direct-acting beta agonist used in congestive heart failure, also demonstrates tachyphylaxis.
- Desmopressin used in the treatment of type 1 von Willebrand disease is, in general, given every 12–24 hours in limited numbers due to its tachyphylactic properties.
- Erythromycin, used for gastroparesis treatment
- Hormone replacement, when used in menopausal women in the form of estrogen and progesterone implants, is cited as having potential to lead to tachyphylaxis, but that citation is based on a single study done in 1990 and no follow-up research is available to support this interpretation.

== Intervention and reversal ==
=== Intranasal decongestants ===
Use of nasal decongestants (e.g., oxymetazoline) for more than three days leads to tachyphylaxis of response and rebound congestion, caused by alpha-adrenergic receptor downregulation and desensitization. The mechanism may specifically include receptor internalisation and resistance to endogenous vasoconstrictors causing worsening in symptoms post use of medication. Oxymetazoline-induced tachyphylaxis and rebound congestion are reversed by intranasal fluticasone.

== See also ==
- Desensitization (medicine)
- Habituation
- Mithridatism
- Physical dependence
- Physiological tolerance
- Downregulation and upregulation
