= C21H30N2O =

The molecular formula C_{21}H_{30}N_{2}O (molar mass: 326.484 g/mol, exact mass: 326.2358 u) may refer to:

- Bunaftine
- FT-104
- Hydroxystenozole, also known as 17α-methylandrost-4-eno[3,2-c]pyrazol-17β-ol
