= Carbocromen =

Vasodilator

Clinical data
- AHFS/Drugs.com: International Drug Names
- ATC code: C01DX05 (WHO)

Identifiers
- IUPAC name: ethyl 2-({3-[2-(diethylamino)ethyl]-4-methyl-2-oxo-2H-chromen-7-yl}oxy)acetate
- CAS Number: 804-10-4
- PubChem CID: 12604
- ChemSpider: 12084
- UNII: R0C9NIE5JJ
- ChEMBL: ChEMBL163672
- CompTox Dashboard (EPA): DTXSID60230301
- ECHA InfoCard: 100.011.233

Chemical and physical data
- Formula: C_{20}H_{27}NO_{5}
- Molar mass: 361.438 g·mol^{−1}
- 3D model (JSmol): Interactive image
- SMILES: O=C(OCC)COc2ccc\1c(OC(=O)/C(=C/1C)CCN(CC)CC)c2
- InChI: InChI=1S/C20H27NO5/c1-5-21(6-2)11-10-17-14(4)16-9-8-15(12-18(16)26-20(17)23)25-13-19(22)24-7-3/h8-9,12H,5-7,10-11,13H2,1-4H3; Key:KLOIYEQEVSIOOO-UHFFFAOYSA-N

Carbocromen (chromonar) is a vasodilator. It was used as a coronary dilator between 1963 and 1966.
