= Tiracizine =

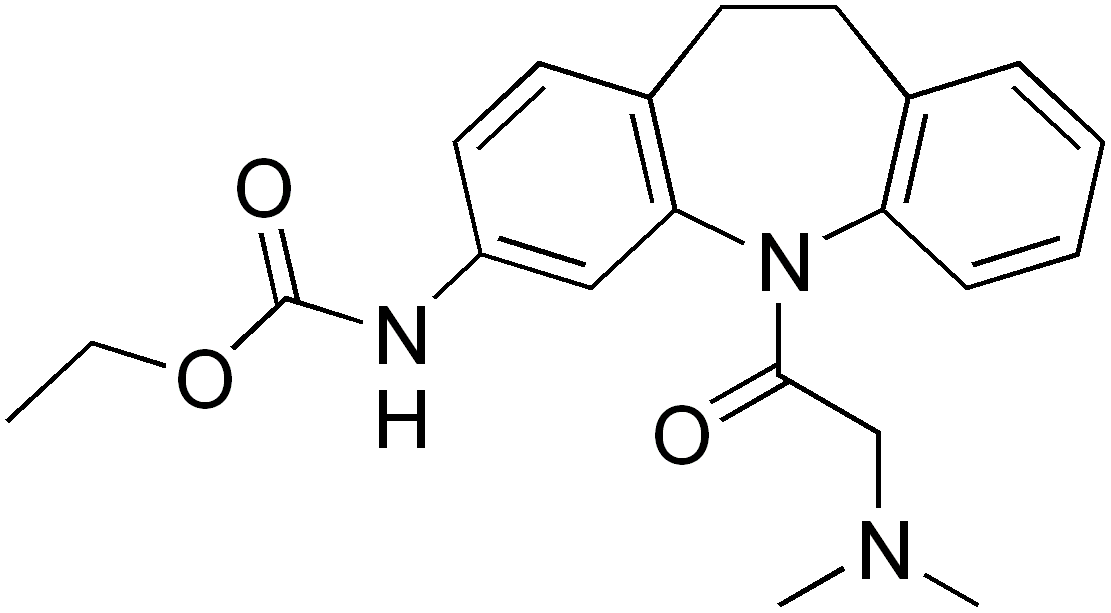

Names
- IUPAC name Ethyl [5-(N,N-dimethylglycyl)-10,11-dihydro-5H-dibenzo[b,f]azepin-3-yl]carbamate
- Systematic IUPAC name Ethyl {5-[(dimethylamino)acetyl]-10,11-dihydro-5H-dibenzo[b,f]azepin-3-yl}carbamate

Identifiers
CAS Number	83275-56-3
3D model (JSmol)	Interactive image
ChemSpider	64392
KEGG	D07164
PubChem CID	71264
UNII	9UUO2T61K7
CompTox Dashboard (EPA)	DTXSID5048714
- InChI: InChI=1S/C21H25N3O3/c1-4-27-21(26)22-17-12-11-16-10-9-15-7-5-6-8-18(15)24(19(16)13-17)20(25)14-23(2)3/h5-8,11-13H,4,9-10,14H2,1-3H3,(H,22,26) Key: KJAMZCVTJDTESW-UHFFFAOYSA-N
- SMILES: CCOC(=O)NC1=CC2=C(CCC3=CC=CC=C3N2C(=O)CN(C)C)C=C1

Properties
Chemical formula	C_{21}H_{25}N_{3}O_{3}
Molar mass	367.4415

Pharmacology
ATC code	C01EB11 (WHO)
- Except where otherwise noted, data are given for materials in their standard state (at 25 °C [77 °F], 100 kPa). verify (what is ?) Infobox references

Tiracizine is an antiarrhythmic agent.
