= Angiotensin II (medication) =

Medication for low blood pressure

Clinical data
- Trade names: Giapreza
- Other names: Ang II
- AHFS/Drugs.com: Monograph
- License data: US DailyMed: Angiotensin II
- Routes of administration: Intravenous injection
- Drug class: Vasoconstrictor
- ATC code: C01CX09 (WHO)

Legal status
- Legal status: US: ℞-only; EU: Rx-only

Pharmacokinetic data
- Protein binding: None
- Metabolism: Proteolysis by glutamyl aminopeptidase, angiotensin converting enzyme 2
- Metabolites: Angiotensin III, angiotensin-(1-7)
- Elimination half-life: Less than one minute (IV administration)

Identifiers
- IUPAC name: L-alpha-aspartyl-L-arginyl-L-valyl-L-tyrosyl-L-isoleucyl-L-histidyl-L-prolyl-L-phenylalanine
- CAS Number: 4474-91-3
- PubChem CID: 172198
- DrugBank: DB11842
- ChemSpider: 150504
- UNII: M089EFU921
- KEGG: D02014; as salt: D11142
- CompTox Dashboard (EPA): DTXSID30196288

Chemical and physical data
- Formula: C_{50}H_{71}N_{13}O_{12}
- Molar mass: 1046.197 g·mol^{−1}
- 3D model (JSmol): Interactive image
- SMILES: CC[C@H](C)[C@@H](C(=O)N[C@@H](CC1=CN=CN1)C(=O)N2CCC[C@H]2C(=O)N[C@@H](CC3=CC=CC=C3)C(=O)O)NC(=O)[C@H](CC4=CC=C(C=C4)O)NC(=O)[C@H](C(C)C)NC(=O)[C@H](CCCN=C(N)N)NC(=O)[C@H](CC(=O)O)N
- InChI: InChI=InChI=1S/C50H71N13O12/c1-5-28(4)41(47(72)59-36(23-31-25-54-26-56-31)48(73)63-20-10-14-38(63)45(70)60-37(49(74)75)22-29-11-7-6-8-12-29)62-44(69)35(21-30-15-17-32(64)18-16-30)58-46(71)40(27(2)3)61-43(68)34(13-9-19-55-50(52)53)57-42(67)33(51)24-39(65)66/h6-8,11-12,15-18,25-28,33-38,40-41,64H,5,9-10,13-14,19-24,51H2,1-4H3,(H,54,56)(H,57,67)(H,58,71)(H,59,72)(H,60,70)(H,61,68)(H,62,69)(H,65,66)(H,74,75)(H4,52,53,55)/t28-,33-,34-,35-,36-,37-,38-,40-,41-/m0/s1; Key:CZGUSIXMZVURDU-JZXHSEFVSA-N

Angiotensin II, sold under the brand name Giapreza, is a medication that is used to treat hypotension resulting from septic shock or other distributive shock. It is a synthetic vasoconstrictor peptide that is identical to human hormone angiotensin II. The Food and Drug Administration approved the use of angiotensin II in December 2017 to treat low blood pressure resulting from septic shock.

The US Food and Drug Administration (FDA) considers it to be a first-in-class medication. It is approved as a generic medication.

== Medical uses ==
Angiotensin II is a vasoconstrictor used to increase blood pressure in adults with septic or other distributive shock. Angiotensin II is a naturally occurring hormone secreted as part of the renin-angiotensin system that results in powerful systemic vasoconstriction. The vasopressor effects of angiotensin have been studied since it was first isolated in the late 1930s.

== Adverse effects ==
Angiotensin II treated patients are at an increased risk of thromboembolic events. There was a higher incidence of arterial and venous thrombotic and thromboembolic events in patients who received angiotensin II compared to placebo treated patients in the ATHOS-3 study [13% (21/163 patients) vs. 5% (8/158 patients)]. It is recommended that patients be on concurrent venous thromboembolism prophylaxis. Other adverse reactions include thrombocytopenia, tachycardia, fungal infection, delirium, acidosis, hyperglycemia, and peripheral ischemia.

Angiotensin II acts on angiotensin receptor (AT1) on presynaptic adrenergic nerves → release of catecholamine → excessive catecholamine can be harmful as it can cause myocyte necrosis.
