= ATC code C01 =

ATC code C01 Cardiac therapy is a therapeutic subgroup of the Anatomical Therapeutic Chemical Classification System, a system of alphanumeric codes developed by the World Health Organization (WHO) for the classification of drugs and other medical products. Subgroup C01 is part of the anatomical group C Cardiovascular system.

Codes for veterinary use (ATCvet codes) can be created by placing the letter Q in front of the human ATC code: for example, QC01. ATCvet codes without corresponding human ATC codes are cited with the leading Q in the following list.
National versions of the ATC classification may include additional codes not present in this list, which follows the WHO version.

== C01A Cardiac glycosides ==
=== C01AA Digitalis glycosides ===
C01AA01 Acetyldigitoxin
C01AA02 Acetyldigoxin
C01AA03 Digitalis leaves
C01AA04 Digitoxin
C01AA05 Digoxin
C01AA06 Lanatoside C
C01AA07 Deslanoside
C01AA08 Metildigoxin
C01AA09 Gitoformate
C01AA20 Combinations
C01AA52 Acetyldigoxin, combinations
C01AA54 Digitoxin, combinations
C01AA55 Digoxin, combinations
C01AA56 Lanatoside C, combinations
C01AA58 Metildigoxin, combinations

=== C01AB Scilla glycosides ===
C01AB01 Proscillaridin
C01AB02 Meproscillarin
C01AB51 Proscillaridin, combinations

=== C01AC Strophanthus glycosides ===
C01AC01 G-strophanthin
C01AC03 Cymarin
C01AC04 K-strophanthin
C01AC05 Strophanthus tincture/oil
C01AC51 G-strophanthin combinations excl. psycholeptics
C01AC54 K-strophanthin combinations excl. psycholeptics
C01AC55 Strophanthus tincture/oil, combinations excl. psycholeptics
C01AC71 G-strophanthin, combinations with psycholeptics

=== C01AH Homeopathic and anthroposophical preparations with cardiac glycosides ===
C01AH01 Strophanthus gratus
C01AH20 Combinations
C01AH20 Combinations with other agents

=== C01AP Other herbal preparations with cardiac glycosides ===
C01AP01 Lily of the valley herb
C01AP03 Sea onion
C01AP50 Combinations
C01AP51 Other plant glycosides, combinations
C01AP52 Oleander glycosides
C01AP53 Lily of the valley, combinations

=== C01AX Other cardiac glycosides ===
C01AX02 Peruvoside

== C01B Antiarrhythmics, class I and III ==
=== C01BA Antiarrhythmics, class Ia ===
C01BA01 Quinidine
C01BA02 Procainamide
C01BA03 Disopyramide
C01BA04 Sparteine
C01BA05 Ajmaline
C01BA08 Prajmaline
C01BA12 Lorajmine
C01BA13 Dihydroquinidine
C01BA33 Detajmium
C01BA50 Antiarrhythmics, combinations excl. psycholeptics
C01BA51 Quinidine, combinations excl. psycholeptics
C01BA70 Antiarrythmics, combinations with psycholeptics
C01BA71 Quinidine, combinations with psycholeptics

=== C01BB Antiarrhythmics, class Ib ===
C01BB01 Lidocaine
C01BB02 Mexiletine
C01BB03 Tocainide
C01BB04 Aprindine

=== C01BC Antiarrhythmics, class Ic ===
C01BC03 Propafenone
C01BC04 Flecainide
C01BC07 Lorcainide
C01BC08 Encainide
C01BC09 Ethacizine

=== C01BD Antiarrhythmics, class III ===
C01BD01 Amiodarone
C01BD02 Bretylium tosilate
C01BD03 Bunaftine
C01BD04 Dofetilide
C01BD05 Ibutilide
C01BD06 Tedisamil
C01BD07 Dronedarone

=== C01BG Other antiarrhythmics, class I and III ===
C01BG01 Moracizine
C01BG03 Tiracizine
C01BG07 Cibenzoline
C01BG11 Vernakalant

== C01C Cardiac stimulants excl. cardiac glycosides ==
=== C01CA Adrenergic and dopaminergic agents ===
C01CA01 Etilefrine
C01CA02 Isoprenaline
C01CA03 Norepinephrine
C01CA04 Dopamine
C01CA05 Norfenefrine
C01CA06 Phenylephrine
C01CA07 Dobutamine
C01CA08 Oxedrine
C01CA09 Metaraminol
C01CA10 Methoxamine
C01CA11 Mephentermine
C01CA12 Dimetofrine
C01CA13 Prenalterol
C01CA14 Dopexamine
C01CA15 Gepefrine
C01CA16 Ibopamine
C01CA17 Midodrine
C01CA18 Octopamine
C01CA19 Fenoldopam
C01CA21 Cafedrine
C01CA22 Arbutamine
C01CA23 Theodrenaline
C01CA24 Epinephrine
C01CA25 Amezinium metilsulfate
C01CA26 Ephedrine
C01CA27 Droxidopa
C01CA28 Centhaquine
C01CA29 Orciprenaline
C01CA30 Combinations
C01CA32 Pholedrine
C01CA51 Etilefrine, combinations
C01CA55 Norfenefrine, combinations
C01CA58 Oxedrine, combinations
C01CA68 Octopamine, combinations
C01CA81 Metamfepramone, combinations

=== C01CB Ephedrine derivatives ===
C01CA01 Ephedrine
C01CA04 Oxilofrine
C01CA51 Ephedrine, combinations
C01CA54 Oxilofrine, combinations

=== C01CE Phosphodiesterase inhibitors ===
C01CE01 Amrinone
C01CE02 Milrinone
C01CE03 Enoximone
C01CE04 Bucladesine

=== C01CH Homeopathic and anthroposophical cardiac stimulants ===
C01CH20 Combinations

=== C01CX Other cardiac stimulants ===
C01CX06 Angiotensinamide
C01CX07 Xamoterol
C01CX08 Levosimendan
C01CX09 Angiotensin II
C01CX10 Omecamtiv mecarbil
C01CX15 Ipratropium bromide

== C01D Vasodilators used in cardiac diseases ==
=== C01DA Organic nitrates ===
C01DA02 Glyceryl trinitrate
C01DA04 Methylpropylpropanediol dinitrate
C01DA05 Pentaerithrityl tetranitrate
C01DA07 Propatylnitrate
C01DA08 Isosorbide dinitrate
C01DA09 Trolnitrate
C01DA13 Eritrityl tetranitrate
C01DA14 Isosorbide mononitrate
C01DA20 Organic nitrates in combination
C01DA38 Tenitramine
C01DA52 Glyceryl trinitrate, combinations
C01DA54 Methylpropylpropanediol dinitrate, combinations
C01DA55 Pentaerithrityl tetranitrate, combinations
C01DA57 Propatylnitrate, combinations
C01DA58 Isosorbide dinitrate, combinations
C01DA59 Trolnitrate, combinations
C01DA63 Eritrityl tetranitrate, combinations
C01DA70 Organic nitrates in combination with psycholeptics

=== C01DB Quinolone vasodilators ===
C01DB01 Flosequinan

=== C01DX Other vasodilators used in cardiac diseases ===
C01DX01 Itramin tosilate
C01DX02 Prenylamine
C01DX03 Oxyfedrine
C01DX04 Benziodarone
C01DX05 Carbocromen
C01DX06 Hexobendine
C01DX07 Etafenone
C01DX08 Heptaminol
C01DX09 Imolamine
C01DX10 Dilazep
C01DX11 Trapidil
C01DX12 Molsidomine
C01DX13 Efloxate
C01DX14 Cinepazet
C01DX15 Cloridarol
C01DX16 Nicorandil
C01DX18 Linsidomine
C01DX19 Nesiritide
C01DX21 Serelaxin
C01DX22 Vericiguat
C01DX29 Dipyridamole
C01DX51 Itramin tosilate, combinations
C01DX52 Prenylamine, combinations
C01DX53 Oxyfedrine, combinations
C01DX54 Benziodarone, combinations
C01DC55 Carbocromen, combinations
C01DC79 Dipyridamole, combinations

== C01E Other cardiac preparations ==
=== C01EA Prostaglandins ===
C01EA01 Alprostadil

=== C01EB Other cardiac preparations ===
C01EB02 Camphor
C01EB03 Indometacin
C01EB04 Crataegus glycosides
C01EB05 Creatinolfosfate
C01EB06 Fosfocreatine
C01EB07 Fructose 1,6-diphosphate
C01EB09 Ubidecarenone
C01EB10 Adenosine
C01EB11 Tiracizine
C01EB13 Acadesine
C01EB15 Trimetazidine
C01EB16 Ibuprofen
C01EB17 Ivabradine
C01EB18 Ranolazine
C01EB20 Meat extract
C01EB21 Regadenoson
C01EB22 Meldonium
C01EB23 Tiazotic acid
C01EB24 Mavacamten
C01EB25 Acoramidis
C01EB28 Theophylline

=== C01EH Other homeopathic and anthroposophical cardiac preparations ===
C01EH01 Crataegus
C01EH10 Various
C01EH20 Combinations
C01EH50 Combinations with other agents

=== C01EP Other herbal cardiac preparations ===
C01EP01 Hawthorn flower with leaves
C01EP02 Cytisus scoparius
C01EP03 Alpinia galanga
C01EP04 Ammi visnaga fruit
C01EP30 Combinations
C01EP51 Hawthorn flower, combinations

=== C01EX Other cardiac combination products ===
C01EX55 Camphor, combinations
C01EX66 Theophylline, combinations
C01EX67 Proxyphylline, combinations
C01EX68 Theobromine, combinations

== See also ==
- Class II antiarrhythmics (beta blocking agents) are in the ATC group C07.
- Class IV antiarrhythmics (cardiac calcium channel blockers) are in the ATC group C08D.
