= Propatylnitrate =

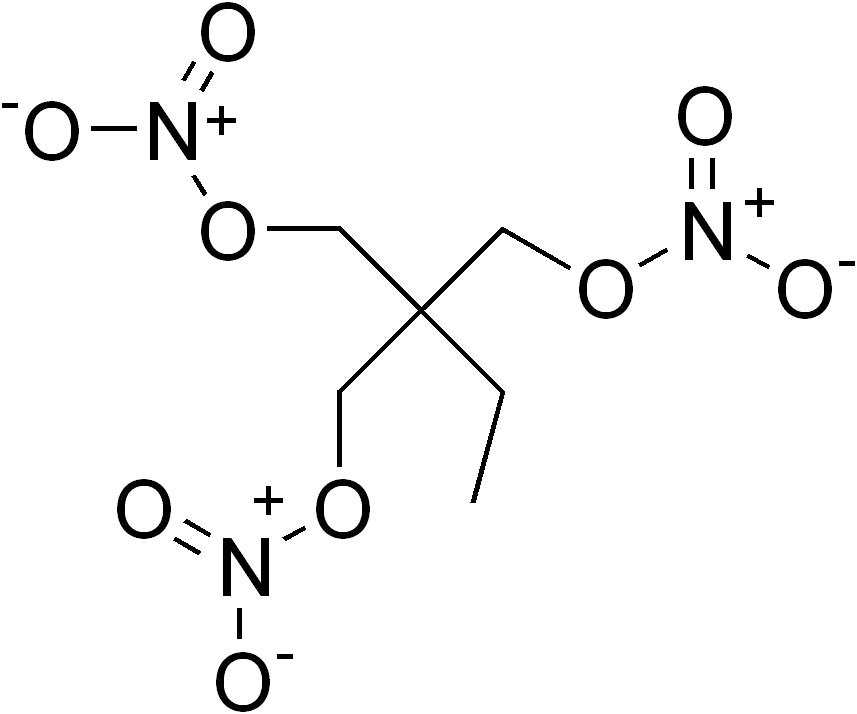

Names
- IUPAC name 2,2-bis(nitrooxymethyl)butyl nitrate

Identifiers
CAS Number	2921-92-8
3D model (JSmol)	Interactive image
ChEMBL	ChEMBL488280
ChemSpider	59642
ECHA InfoCard	100.018.970
PubChem CID	66261
UNII	AJT2YN495R
CompTox Dashboard (EPA)	DTXSID40183467
- InChI: InChI=1S/C6H11N3O9/c1-2-6(3-16-7(10)11,4-17-8(12)13)5-18-9(14)15/h2-5H2,1H3 Key: YZZCJYJBCUJISI-UHFFFAOYSA-N
- SMILES: CCC(CO[N+](=O)[O-])(CO[N+](=O)[O-])CO[N+](=O)[O-]

Properties
Chemical formula	C_{6}H_{11}N_{3}O_{9}
Molar mass	269.17 g/mol

Pharmacology
ATC code	C01DA07 (WHO)
- Except where otherwise noted, data are given for materials in their standard state (at 25 °C [77 °F], 100 kPa). verify (what is ?) Infobox references

Propatylnitrate (propatyl nitrate) is a nitrovasodilator that is used as a medication against angina pectoris.
