= Gitoformate =

Chemical compound

Clinical data
- Trade names: Dynocard
- Other names: Gitoxin 3′,3′,3′′′,4′′′′,16-pentaformate
- ATC code: C01AA09 (WHO)

Identifiers
- IUPAC name: [3-[5-(4,5-diformyloxy-6-methyloxan-2-yl)oxy-4-formyloxy-6-methyloxan-2-yl]oxy-6-[[16-formyloxy-14-hydroxy-10,13-dimethyl-17-(5-oxo-2H-furan-3-yl)-1,2,3,4,5,6,7,8,9,11,12,15,16,17-tetradecahydrocyclopenta[a]phenanthren-3-yl]oxy]-2-methyloxan-4-yl]formate
- CAS Number: 10176-39-3
- PubChem CID: 65598
- ChemSpider: 16736524
- UNII: B69U29O7J9
- KEGG: D07147
- ChEMBL: ChEMBL2103959
- CompTox Dashboard (EPA): DTXSID80144173
- ECHA InfoCard: 100.030.397

Chemical and physical data
- Formula: C_{46}H_{64}O_{19}
- Molar mass: 920.999 g·mol^{−1}
- 3D model (JSmol): Interactive image
- SMILES: CC1C(C(CC(O1)OC2C(OC(CC2OC=O)OC3C(OC(CC3OC=O)OC4CCC5(C(C4)CCC6C5CCC7(C6(CC(C7C8=CC(=O)OC8)OC=O)O)C)C)C)C)OC=O)OC=O
- InChI: InChI=1S/C46H64O19/c1-24-41(59-23-51)32(55-19-47)14-38(60-24)64-43-26(3)62-39(16-34(43)57-21-49)65-42-25(2)61-37(15-33(42)56-20-48)63-29-8-10-44(4)28(13-29)6-7-31-30(44)9-11-45(5)40(27-12-36(52)54-18-27)35(58-22-50)17-46(31,45)53/h12,19-26,28-35,37-43,53H,6-11,13-18H2,1-5H3; Key:DOMHWKQEPDYUQX-UHFFFAOYSA-N

Gitoformate (INN, or pentaformylgitoxin, trade name Dynocard) is a cardiac glycoside, a type of drug that can be used in the treatment of congestive heart failure and cardiac arrhythmia (irregular heartbeat). Produced by Madaus, it is not available in the US, and does not seem to be available in Europe either.

== Chemistry ==
Gitoxigenin, the aglycon

Gitoformate is a derivative of the glycoside gitoxin, with five of the six free hydroxyl groups formylated, one on the aglycon and four on the sugar. Gitoxin, a cardiac glycoside from the woolly foxglove (Digitalis lanata), has an aglycon of the cardenolide type named gitoxigenin, which is also the aglycon of lanatoside B, another Digitalis lanata glycoside.
