= Creatinolfosfate =

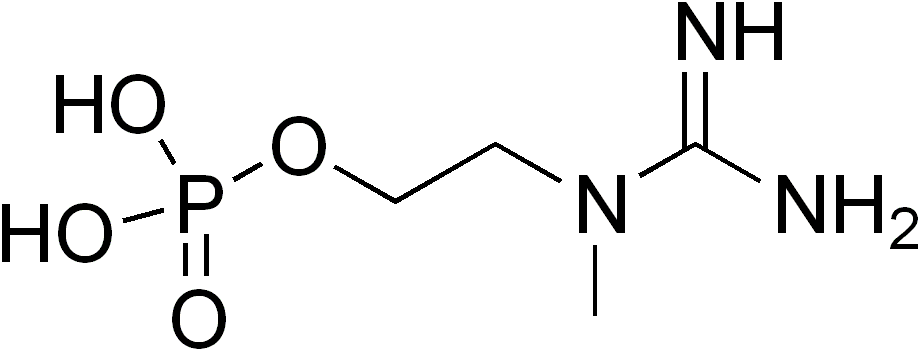

Names
- IUPAC name 2-[Carbamimidoyl(methyl)amino]ethyl dihydrogen phosphate
- Other names Creatinol-O-phosphate; Creatinol phosphate

Identifiers
CAS Number	6903-79-3
3D model (JSmol)	Interactive image
Abbreviations	COP
ChEMBL	ChEMBL2104114
ChemSpider	21827
ECHA InfoCard	100.027.283
KEGG	D07162
PubChem CID	23342
UNII	5O564RN1QD
CompTox Dashboard (EPA)	DTXSID50219100
- InChI: InChI=1S/C4H12N3O4P/c1-7(4(5)6)2-3-11-12(8,9)10/h2-3H2,1H3,(H3,5,6)(H2,8,9,10) Key: FOIPWTMKYXWFGC-UHFFFAOYSA-N; InChI=1/C4H12N3O4P/c1-7(4(5)6)2-3-11-12(8,9)10/h2-3H2,1H3,(H3,5,6)(H2,8,9,10) Key: FOIPWTMKYXWFGC-UHFFFAOYAY
- SMILES: O=P(O)(OCCN(C(=[N@H])N)C)O

Properties
Chemical formula	C_{4}H_{12}N_{3}O_{4}P
Molar mass	197.13 g/mol

Pharmacology
ATC code	C01EB05 (WHO)
- Except where otherwise noted, data are given for materials in their standard state (at 25 °C [77 °F], 100 kPa). verify (what is ?) Infobox references

Creatinolfosfate (creatinol-O-phosphate, creatinol phosphate, COP) is a cardiac preparation, not to be confused with phosphocreatine.
