= Deslanoside =

Chemical compound

Clinical data
- AHFS/Drugs.com: International Drug Names
- ATC code: C01AA07 (WHO)

Identifiers
- IUPAC name: (3β,5β,12β)-3-[(O-β-D-glucopyranosyl-(1→4)-O-2,6-dideoxy-β-D-ribo-hexopyranosyl-(1→4)-O-2,6-dideoxy-β-D-ribo-hexopyranosyl-(1→4)-2,6-dideoxy-β-D-ribo-hexopyranosyl)oxy]-12,14-dihydroxycard-20(22)-enolide
- CAS Number: 17598-65-1
- PubChem CID: 28620
- IUPHAR/BPS: 6806
- DrugBank: DB01078
- ChemSpider: 26618
- UNII: YGY317RK75
- KEGG: D01240
- ChEBI: CHEBI:31468
- ChEMBL: ChEMBL1614
- CompTox Dashboard (EPA): DTXSID1022897
- ECHA InfoCard: 100.037.774

Chemical and physical data
- Formula: C_{47}H_{74}O_{19}
- Molar mass: 943.090 g·mol^{−1}
- InChI: InChI=1S/C47H74O19/c1-20-41(64-36-16-30(50)42(21(2)60-36)65-37-17-31(51)43(22(3)61-37)66-44-40(56)39(55)38(54)32(18-48)63-44)29(49)15-35(59-20)62-25-8-10-45(4)24(13-25)6-7-27-28(45)14-33(52)46(5)26(9-11-47(27,46)57)23-12-34(53)58-19-23/h12,20-22,24-33,35-44,48-52,54-57H,6-11,13-19H2,1-5H3/t20-,21-,22-,24-,25+,26-,27-,28+,29+,30+,31+,32-,33-,35+,36+,37+,38-,39+,40-,41-,42-,43-,44+,45+,46+,47+/m1/s1; Key:OBATZBGFDSVCJD-LALPQLPRSA-N

Deslanoside (trade name Cedilanide in Brazil) is a cardiac glycoside, a type of drug that can be used in the treatment of congestive heart failure and cardiac arrhythmia (irregular heartbeat). It is found in the leaves of Digitalis lanata, the Woolly Foxglove.
