= Lorajmine =

Chemical compound

Clinical data
- ATC code: C01BA12 (WHO)

Identifiers
- IUPAC name: (17R,21β)-ajmalan-17,21-diol 17-chloroacetate OR (1R,9R,10S,13R,14R,16S,18S)-13-ethyl-8-methyl-14-hydroxy-8,15-diazahexacyclo [14.2.1.0^{1,9}.0^{2,7}.0^{10,15}.0^{12,17}]nonadeca-2(7),3,5-triene-18-yl chloroacetate
- CAS Number: 47562-08-3
- PubChem CID: 76957773
- ChemSpider: 16735878
- UNII: F96VX65849
- ChEMBL: ChEMBL2111031
- ECHA InfoCard: 100.051.185

Chemical and physical data
- Formula: C_{22}H_{27}ClN_{2}O_{3}
- Molar mass: 402.92 g·mol^{−1}
- 3D model (JSmol): Interactive image
- SMILES: CCC1C2CC3C4C5(CC(C2C5C(=O)OCCl)N3C1O)C6=CC=CC=C6N4C
- InChI: InChI=1S/C22H27ClN2O3/c1-3-11-12-8-15-19-22(13-6-4-5-7-14(13)24(19)2)9-16(25(15)21(11)27)18(12)20(22)28-17(26)10-23/h4-7,11-12,15-16,18-21,27H,3,8-10H2,1-2H3/t11-,12-,15-,16-,18?,19-,20+,21+,22+/m0/s1; Key:LAHDERDHXJFFJU-KBFYUGGWSA-N

Lorajmine (17-monochloroacetylajmaline) is a drug that is a potent sodium channel blocker (more specifically, a class Ia antiarrhythmic agent) that was used for treating arrhythmia. It is derived from ajmaline, an alkaloid from the roots of Rauvolfia serpentina, by synthetically adding a chloroacetate residue.
