= Hydralazine/isosorbide dinitrate =

Chemical compound

Combination of
- Isosorbide dinitrate: Vasodilator
- Hydralazine: Antihypertensive

Clinical data
- Trade names: Bidil
- License data: US DailyMed: Hydralazine_and_isosorbide dinitrate
- Routes of administration: By mouth
- ATC code: None

Legal status
- Legal status: US: ℞-only

Identifiers
- ChemSpider: 8019384
- KEGG: D10209
- CompTox Dashboard (EPA): DTXSID90987755

Hydralazine/isosorbide dinitrate, sold under the brand name Bidil, is a fixed-dose combination medication used to treat self-identified Black people with congestive heart failure. It is a combination of hydralazine hydrochloride (an arteriolar vasodilator) and isosorbide dinitrate (a nitrate vasodilator).

The US Food and Drug Administration (FDA) approved medication to treat congestive heart failure in specifically self-identified Black patients. It provoked controversy as the first drug approved by the FDA marketed for a single racial-ethnic group.

== History ==
From 1980 to 1985, Dr. Jay Cohn of the University of Minnesota led a clinical trial in collaboration with the US Veterans Administration called the Vasodilator-Heart Failure Trial (V-HeFT I) that tested whether the combination of isosorbide dinitrate and hydralazine increased survival in patients with heart failure. The results were promising and a follow-up study, V-HeFT II, tested the novel combination against enalapril. Cohn applied for a patent on the combination treatment, which was issued in 1989 as US Patent 4868179. Cohn then licensed the patent to Medco Pharmaceuticals who went on to prepare a New Drug Application (NDA) to approve BiDil on the basis of the V-HeFT trials.

The V-HeFT data was re-analyzed and found that the drug combination appeared to be more effective in treating self-identified African-Americans. This was a significant finding due to prior studies which showed that African-Americans with congestive heart failure (CHF) appeared to respond less effectively to conventional CHF treatments (particularly ACE inhibitors) than White Americans. A new paper was published on these findings and MedCo filed for a new patent for the drug as a treatment for heart failure specifically in black patients.

The new patent and the old patent were then licensed to a company called NitroMed, which ran a clinical called the African-American Heart Failure Trial (A-HeFT), the results of which were published in 2004 in the New England Journal of Medicine. The clinical trial was stopped early because the drug showed significant benefit; it reduced mortality by 43%, reduced hospitalizations by 39%, and improved quality of life markers in African-American patients with CHF.

On the basis of A-HeFT, the FDA approved BiDil in June 2005. In 2006, the Heart Failure Society of America included the use of the fixed dose combination of isosorbide dinitrate/hydralazine as the standard of care in the treatment of heart failure in Black patients.

== Society and culture ==
=== Controversy ===
The new drug application claiming treatment of a single, self-identified racial group raised a storm of controversy. Some hailed the development of BiDil as a breakthrough for Black Americans (such groups included the congressional Black Caucus, the Association of Black Cardiologists, the National Medical Association, and the National Association for the Advancement of Colored People) and a step to addressing the unique health care needs and health disparities of the African American community.

Others who criticized the preliminary studies argued that the original study did not have a significant number of African-American subjects to make the BiDil's race specific claims, and that the results of only one clinical trial where African-Americans were tested does not provide a full and comprehensive study. Furthermore, critics argued that self-identified racial identifications from patients as an indicator for race during the trials were not a sufficient categorization method because these self-identifications were socially constructed and have no biological connection to genomic data. They argued that the trials represented a new form of scientific racism where race, a socially constructed category, would continue to be present in research as a placeholder for genomic identification.

The A-HeFT trial has been the subject of further criticism due to its study design that failed to include a non-African American test group to control for racial factors. According to Jay Cohn, the pill's developer, the reason for including only African American test subjects was the lack of funding for doing a trial in the full population.
