= Imolamine =

Chemical compound

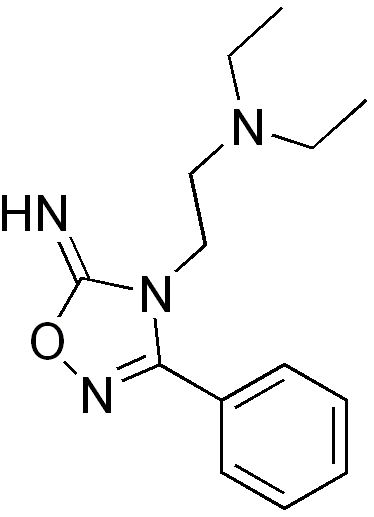

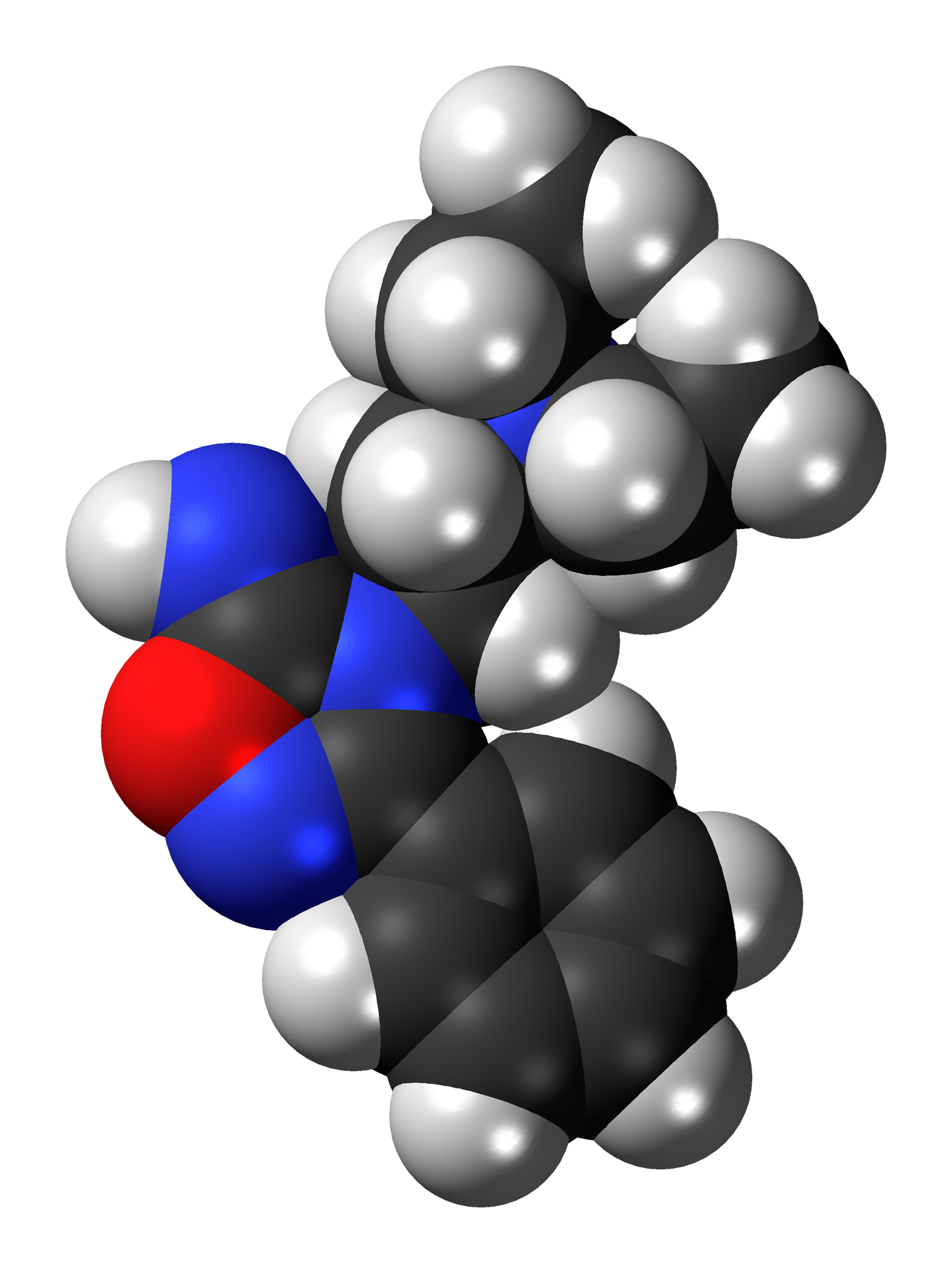

Clinical data
- Trade names: Angolon, Angoril, Circuline, Irri-Cor, Irrigor, Coremax
- ATC code: C01DX09 (WHO)

Identifiers
- IUPAC name: Diethyl[2-(5-imino-3-phenyl-4,5-dihydro-1,2,4-oxadiazol-4-yl)ethyl]amine
- CAS Number: 318-23-0 15823-89-9 (HCl)
- PubChem CID: 27501
- DrugBank: DB09284
- ChemSpider: 10669810
- UNII: K5F4RU5VQJ
- KEGG: D07159
- ChEMBL: ChEMBL2104282
- CompTox Dashboard (EPA): DTXSID00861870
- ECHA InfoCard: 100.005.699

Chemical and physical data
- Formula: C_{14}H_{20}N_{4}O
- Molar mass: 260.341 g·mol^{−1}
- 3D model (JSmol): Interactive image
- SMILES: CCN(CC)CCN2C(=N)O\N=C2\c1ccccc1
- InChI: InChI=1S/C14H20N4O/c1-3-17(4-2)10-11-18-13(16-19-14(18)15)12-8-6-5-7-9-12/h5-9,15H,3-4,10-11H2,1-2H3; Key:MGSPDRWOUCPKNZ-UHFFFAOYSA-N

Imolamine (INN, BAN; brand names Angolon, Angoril, Circuline, Irri-Cor, Irrigor, Coremax) is a coronary vasodilator which is used in the treatment of angina pectoris and as a local anesthetic.

Several patents describing its use have been issued.

== Synthesis ==
Thieme Patent

The reaction of benzoylchloride oxime (2) with cyanamide (3) gives 3-phenyl-1,2,4-oxadiazol-5-amine (4). Alkylation with 2-chlorotriethylamine (5) in the presence of potassium hydroxide (KOH) occurs at the endocyclic ring nitrogen completing the synthesis of imolamine (6).

Butalamine has very similar synthesis but is alkylated on the alternate nitrogen position.
