= Α-Acetyldigoxin =

Chemical compound

α-Acetyldigoxin
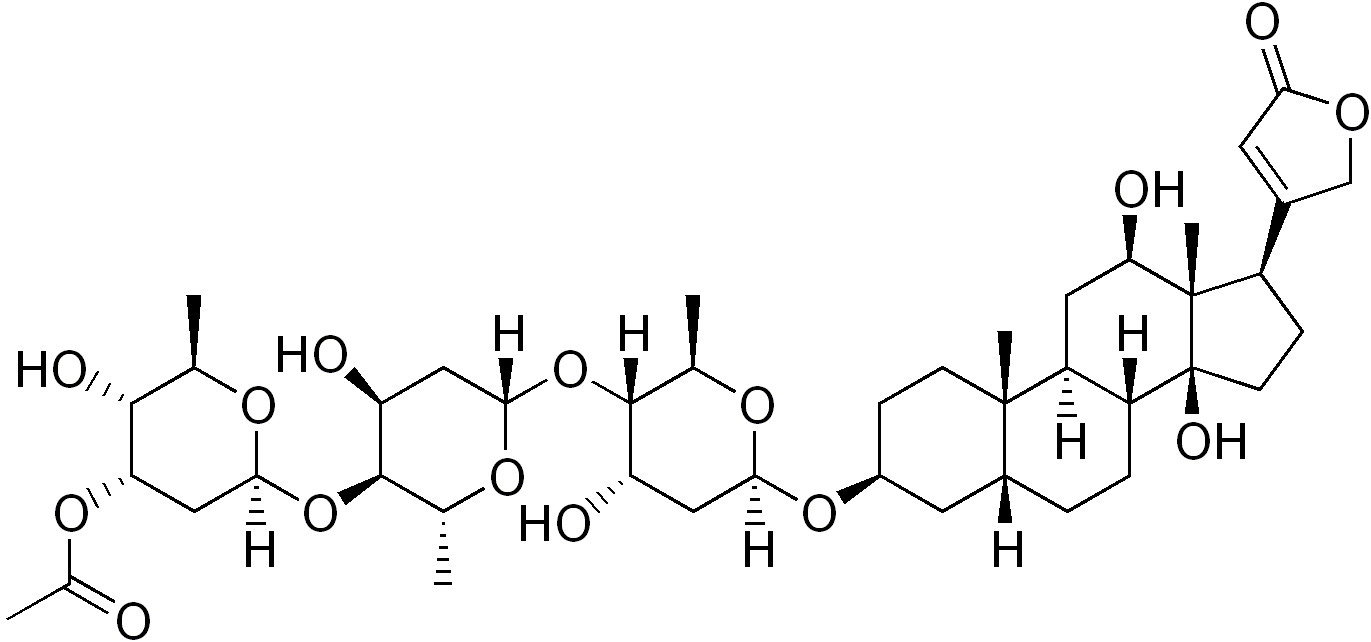

Clinical data
- AHFS/Drugs.com: International Drug Names
- Routes of administration: Oral
- ATC code: C01AA02 (WHO)

Pharmacokinetic data
- Bioavailability: 90%(Oral)
- Protein binding: 20–30%
- Elimination half-life: 40h

Identifiers
- IUPAC name: [6-[6-[ [6-[ [12,14-dihydroxy-10,13-dimethyl-17-
- CAS Number: 5511-98-8
- PubChem CID: 91545
- ChemSpider: 9940650
- UNII: Q28IFH7A50
- CompTox Dashboard (EPA): DTXSID00203630
- ECHA InfoCard: 100.024.414

Chemical and physical data
- Formula: C_{43}H_{66}O_{15}
- Molar mass: 822.986 g·mol^{−1}
- 3D model (JSmol): Interactive image
- SMILES: O=C\1OC/C(=C/1)[C@H]2CC[C@@]8(O)[C@]2(C)[C@H](O)C[C@H]7[C@H]8CC[C@H]6[C@]7(C)CC[C@H](O[C@@H]5O[C@H](C)[C@@H](O[C@@H]4O[C@@H]([C@@H](O[C@@H]3O[C@@H]([C@@H](O)[C@@H](OC(=O)C)C3)C)[C@@H](O)C4)C)[C@@H](O)C5)C6
- InChI: InChI=1S/C43H66O15/c1-20-38(49)32(55-23(4)44)18-37(52-20)58-40-22(3)54-36(17-31(40)46)57-39-21(2)53-35(16-30(39)45)56-26-9-11-41(5)25(14-26)7-8-28-29(41)15-33(47)42(6)27(10-12-43(28,42)50)24-13-34(48)51-19-24/h13,20-22,25-33,35-40,45-47,49-50H,7-12,14-19H2,1-6H3/t20-,21-,22-,25-,26+,27-,28-,29+,30+,31+,32+,33-,35+,36+,37+,38-,39-,40-,41+,42+,43+/m1/s1; Key:HWKJSYYYURVNQU-DXJNJSHLSA-N

α-Acetyldigoxin is a cardiac glycoside found in plants of the genus Digitalis, including Digitalis lanata. It is an acetyl derivative of digoxin and an isomer of β-acetyldigoxin.

α-Acetyldigoxin increases the contractility of the heart by its positive inotropic effect on cardiac muscle. The effects of α-acetyldigoxin begin 3–4 hours after administration, and maximize after 6–8 hours. It is prescribed for congestive chronic cardiac failure class II, III and IV.
