= Efloxate =

Chemical compound

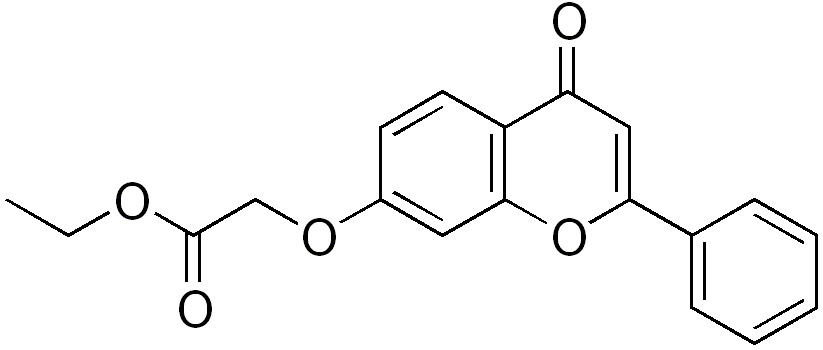

Clinical data
- ATC code: C01DX13 (WHO)

Identifiers
- IUPAC name: ethyl 2-[(4-oxo-2-phenyl-4H-chromen-7-yl)oxy]acetate
- CAS Number: 119-41-5
- PubChem CID: 8395
- ChemSpider: 8089
- UNII: CZU6V3902K
- ChEMBL: ChEMBL1349073
- CompTox Dashboard (EPA): DTXSID3048736
- ECHA InfoCard: 100.003.929

Chemical and physical data
- Formula: C_{19}H_{16}O_{5}
- Molar mass: 324.332 g·mol^{−1}
- 3D model (JSmol): Interactive image
- SMILES: CCOC(=O)COc1ccc2c(=O)cc(oc2c1)c3ccccc3
- InChI: InChI=1S/C19H16O5/c1-2-22-19(21)12-23-14-8-9-15-16(20)11-17(24-18(15)10-14)13-6-4-3-5-7-13/h3-11H,2,12H2,1H3; Key:ZVXBAHLOGZCFTP-UHFFFAOYSA-N

Efloxate is a vasodilator.
