= Angiotensinamide =

Chemical compound

Clinical data
- Routes of administration: Intravenous infusion
- ATC code: C01CX06 (WHO)

Identifiers
- IUPAC name: 2-[(1-{2-[2-(2-{2-[2-(2-amino-3-carbamoylpropanamido)-5-[(diaminomethylidene)amino]pentanamido]-3-methylbutanamido}-3-(4-hydroxyphenyl)propanamido)-3-methylbutanamido]-3-(1H-imidazol-5-yl)propanoyl}pyrrolidin-2-yl)formamido]-3-phenylpropanoic acid
- CAS Number: 53-73-6
- PubChem CID: 10351092
- ChemSpider: 8526544
- UNII: 7WAL1X78KV
- KEGG: D02939
- ChEMBL: ChEMBL409803
- CompTox Dashboard (EPA): DTXSID401018923
- ECHA InfoCard: 100.000.167

Chemical and physical data
- Formula: C_{49}H_{70}N_{14}O_{11}
- Molar mass: 1031.186 g·mol^{−1}
- 3D model (JSmol): Interactive image
- SMILES: O=C(N)C[C@H](N)C(=O)N[C@H](C(=O)N[C@H](C(=O)N[C@H](C(=O)N[C@H](C(=O)N[C@H](C(=O)N2[C@H](C(=O)N[C@H](C(=O)O)Cc1ccccc1)CCC2)Cc3cnc[nH]3)C(C)C)Cc4ccc(O)cc4)C(C)C)CCC/N=C(\N)N
- InChI: InChI=1S/C49H70N14O11/c1-26(2)39(61-42(67)33(12-8-18-55-49(52)53)57-41(66)32(50)23-38(51)65)45(70)58-34(20-29-14-16-31(64)17-15-29)43(68)62-40(27(3)4)46(71)59-35(22-30-24-54-25-56-30)47(72)63-19-9-13-37(63)44(69)60-36(48(73)74)21-28-10-6-5-7-11-28/h5-7,10-11,14-17,24-27,32-37,39-40,64H,8-9,12-13,18-23,50H2,1-4H3,(H2,51,65)(H,54,56)(H,57,66)(H,58,70)(H,59,71)(H,60,69)(H,61,67)(H,62,68)(H,73,74)(H4,52,53,55)/t32-,33-,34-,35-,36-,37-,39-,40-/m0/s1; Key:JYPVVOOBQVVUQV-CGHBYZBKSA-N

Angiotensinamide (INN; BAN and USAN angiotensin amide) is a potent vasoconstrictor used as a cardiac stimulant. It is a derivative of angiotensin II.

== See also ==
- Angiotensin
