= Etafenone =

Chemical compound

Clinical data
- ATC code: C01DX07 (WHO)

Identifiers
- IUPAC name: 1-(3-{2-[2-(diethylamino)ethoxy]phenyl}phenyl)propan-1-one
- CAS Number: 90-54-0
- PubChem CID: 3275
- ChemSpider: 3160
- UNII: 0I14K589E7
- KEGG: D01440
- CompTox Dashboard (EPA): DTXSID6046181

Chemical and physical data
- Formula: C_{21}H_{27}NO_{2}
- Molar mass: 325.452 g·mol^{−1}
- 3D model (JSmol): Interactive image
- SMILES: CCN(CC)CCOc1ccccc1C(=O)CCc2ccccc2
- InChI: InChI=1S/C21H27NO2/c1-3-22(4-2)16-17-24-21-13-9-8-12-19(21)20(23)15-14-18-10-6-5-7-11-18/h5-13H,3-4,14-17H2,1-2H3; Key:OEGDFSLNGABBKJ-UHFFFAOYSA-N

Etafenone is a vasodilator which has been used as an antianginal agent.
