= Bunaftine =

Chemical compound

Clinical data
- ATC code: C01BD03 (WHO)

Identifiers
- IUPAC name: N-[2-(Diethylamino)ethyl]-N-propylnaphthalene-1-carboxamide
- CAS Number: 32421-46-8
- PubChem CID: 36131
- ChemSpider: 33233
- UNII: GH09PRQ3FU
- KEGG: D07428
- ChEMBL: ChEMBL2104200
- CompTox Dashboard (EPA): DTXSID90186165
- ECHA InfoCard: 100.046.373

Chemical and physical data
- Formula: C_{21}H_{30}N_{2}O
- Molar mass: 326.484 g·mol^{−1}
- 3D model (JSmol): Interactive image
- SMILES: O=C(N(CCCC)CCN(CC)CC)c2cccc1ccccc12
- InChI: InChI=1S/C21H30N2O/c1-4-7-15-23(17-16-22(5-2)6-3)21(24)20-14-10-12-18-11-8-9-13-19(18)20/h8-14H,4-7,15-17H2,1-3H3; Key:WWGZXRYELYWJBD-UHFFFAOYSA-N

Bunaftine (or bunaphtine) is an antiarrhythmic agent. It is classified in class III.
