= Nitroglycerin (medication) =

Medication

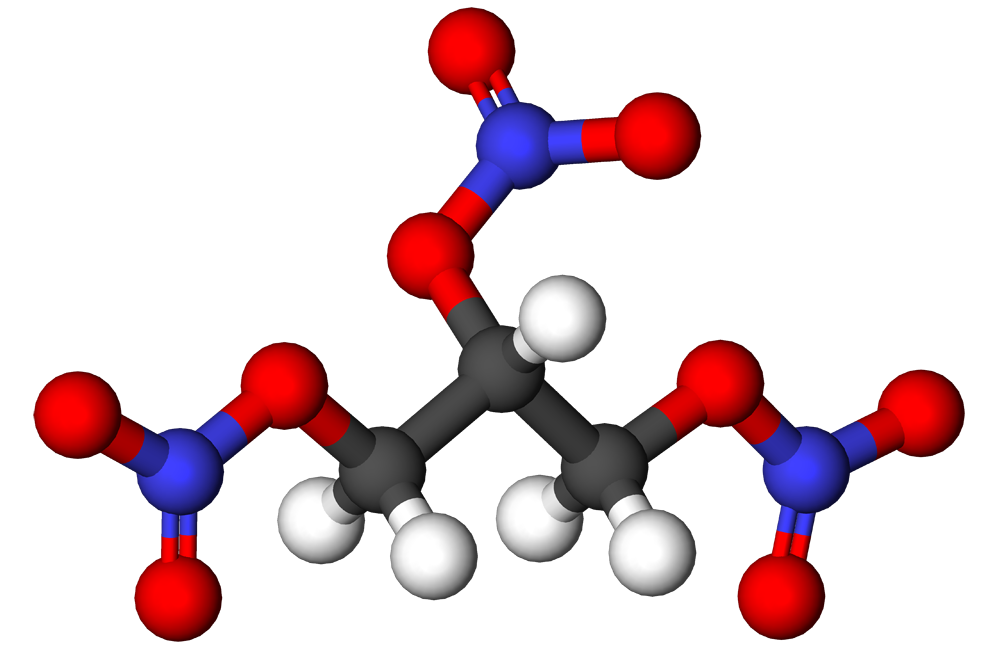

Clinical data
- Trade names: Nitrol, others
- Other names: Glyceryl trinitrate
- AHFS/Drugs.com: Monograph
- MedlinePlus: a601086
- Routes of administration: Sublingual, transdermal, by mouth, intravenous
- ATC code: C01DA02 (WHO) C05AE01 (WHO)

Legal status
- Legal status: AU: S3 (Pharmacist only); UK: P (Pharmacy medicines); US: ℞-only

Pharmacokinetic data
- Bioavailability: <1%
- Metabolism: liver (rapid), red blood cells, vascular wall
- Elimination half-life: 3 minutes
- Excretion: In urine, in bile

Identifiers
- IUPAC name: 1,3-dinitrooxypropan-2-yl nitrate; [3-(nitrooxy)-2-[(nitrooxy)methyl]propyl] nitrate; 1,2,3-trinitroxy propane
- CAS Number: 55-63-0
- PubChem CID: 4510
- IUPHAR/BPS: 7053
- DrugBank: DB00727
- ChemSpider: 4354
- UNII: G59M7S0WS3
- ChEBI: CHEBI:28787
- ChEMBL: ChEMBL730

Chemical and physical data
- Formula: C_{3}H_{5}N_{3}O_{9}
- Molar mass: 227.085 g·mol^{−1}
- 3D model (JSmol): Interactive image
- SMILES: C(C(CO[N+](=O)[O-])O[N+](=O)[O-])O[N+](=O)[O-]
- InChI: InChI=1S/C3H5N3O9/c7-4(8)13-1-3(15-6(11)12)2-14-5(9)10/h3H,1-2H2; Key:SNIOPGDIGTZGOP-UHFFFAOYSA-N

Nitroglycerin, also known as glyceryl trinitrate (GTN), is a vasodilator used for heart failure, high blood pressure, anal fissures, painful periods, treating the pain from esophageal spasm, and to treat and prevent chest pain caused by decreased blood flow to the heart (angina) or due to the recreational use of cocaine. This includes chest pain from a heart attack. It is taken by mouth, under the tongue, applied to the skin by cream or a patch, as a spray, or by injection into a vein.

Common side effects include headache and low blood pressure. The low blood pressure can be severe. It is unclear if use in pregnancy is safe for the fetus. It should not be used together with medications within the PDE5 inhibitor family such as sildenafil due to the risk of low blood pressure. Nitroglycerin is in the nitrate family of medications. While it is not entirely clear how it works, it is believed to function by dilating blood vessels.

Nitroglycerin was written about as early as 1846 and came into medical use in 1878. The drug nitroglycerin is a dilute form of the same chemical used as the explosive, nitroglycerin. Dilution makes it non-explosive. In 2023, it was the 207th most commonly prescribed medication in the United States, with more than 2 million prescriptions.

== Medical uses ==
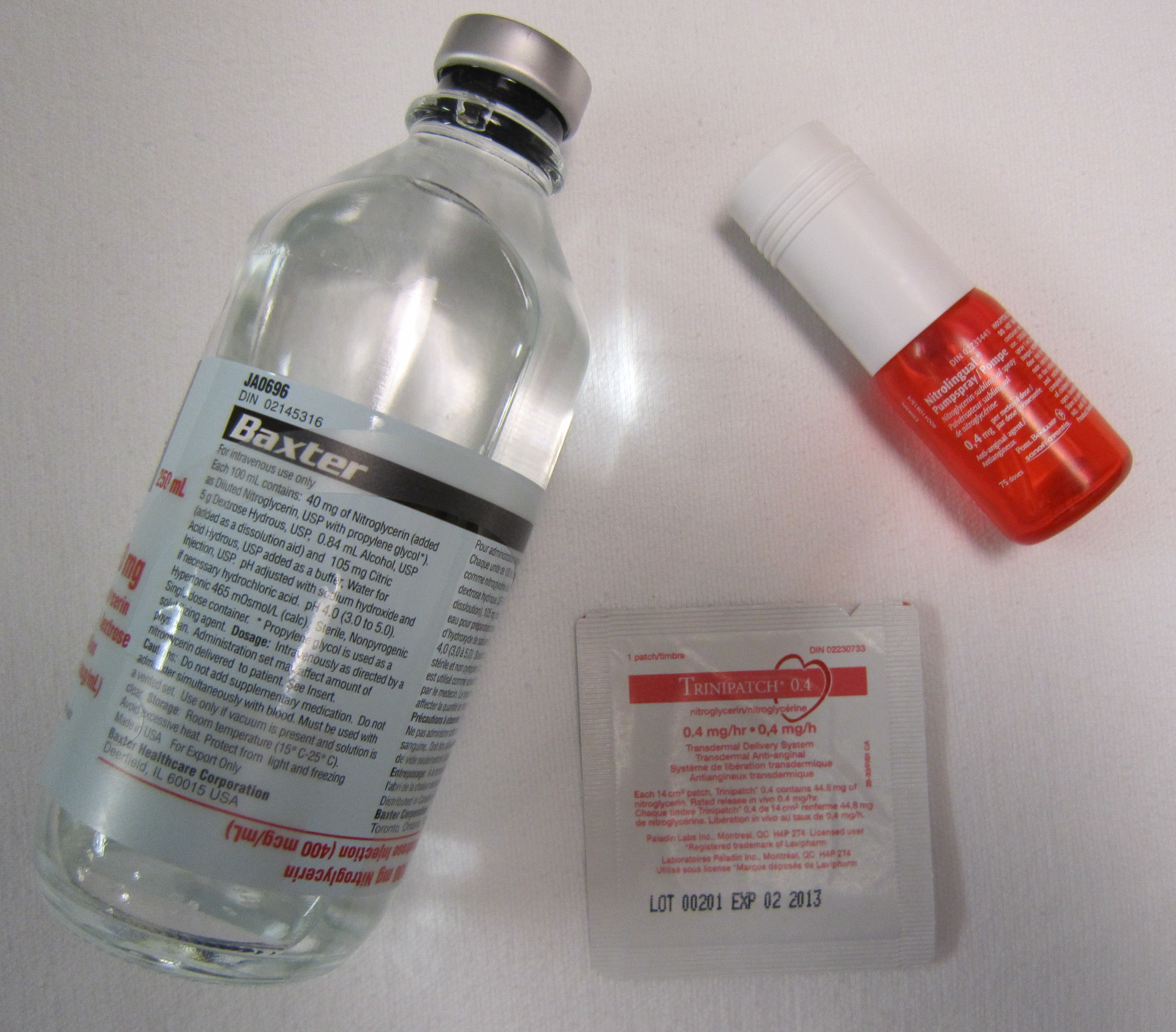
Three different forms of nitroglycerin: intravenous, sublingual spray, and the nitroglycerin patch.

Nitroglycerin is used for the treatment of angina, acute myocardial infarction, severe hypertension, and acute coronary artery spasms. It may be administered intravenously, as a sublingual spray/tablet, or as a patch applied to the skin.

=== Angina ===
Nitroglycerin is useful in decreasing angina attacks, perhaps more so than reversing angina once started, by supplementing blood concentrations of NO, also called endothelium-derived relaxing factor, before the structure of NO as the responsible agent was known. This led to the development of transdermal patches of nitroglycerin, providing 24-hour release. However, the effectiveness of nitroglycerin is limited by development of tolerance/tachyphylaxis within 2–3 weeks of sustained use. Continuous administration and absorption (such as provided by daily pills and especially skin patches) accelerate onset of tolerance and limit the usefulness of the agent. Thus, nitroglycerin works best when used only in short-term, pulse dosing. Indeed, studies show that a dosing regimen should include nitrate-free days, and in the case of transdermal patches (such as with Nitro-dur), which provide 10-12 hours daily of sustained release for at least 1 month but don't yet have an established minimum time for nitrate-free windows, periods of 10-12 hours is sufficient for preventing tolerance build-up; therefore, an appropriate dosing schedule when used as patches (such as in the case with Nitro-dur) would include 12-14 hours of patch-on followed by a window of 10-12 hours of patch-off.

Other forms of the drug are more effective for treatment of acute episodes of angina once they have started (while most forms are not due to the lack of rapid administration of the drug), and some are useful in the prophylaxis of angina before activities which may precipitate an episode, like having sexual intercourse. Nitroglycerin when used as a spray can treat ongoing episodes with no more than three sprays in a 15-minute period and the same as prophylaxis of an angina attack.

Nitroglycerin is useful for myocardial infarction (heart attack) and pulmonary edema, again working best if used quickly, within a few minutes of symptom onset. It may also be given as a sublingual or buccal dose in the form of a tablet placed under the tongue or a spray into the mouth for the treatment of an angina attack.

=== Other uses ===
Tentative evidence indicates efficacy of nitroglycerin in the treatment of various tendinopathies, both in pain management and acceleration of soft tissue repair.

Nitroglycerin is also used in the treatment of anal fissures, though usually at a much lower concentration than that used for angina treatment.

Nitroglycerin has been used to decrease pain associated with dysmenorrhea.

Nitroglycerin was once researched for the prevention and treatment of osteoporosis; however, the researcher Sophie Jamal was found to have falsified the findings, sparking one of the largest scientific misconduct cases in Canada.

Nitroglycerin is also used to treat acute episodes of esophageal spasms, by increasing nitric oxide (NO) levels it acts as a smooth muscle relaxant which relaxes muscle cells and lowers pressure in the lower esophageal sphincter, reducing the intense, uncoordinated contractions in the esophagus and easing chest pain. It is often used to treat esophageal spasms associated with eosinophilic esophagitis and Gastroesophageal reflux disease (GERD), although it appears to be less effective at treating spasms in those with GERD. Nitroglycerin's effect at reducing lower esophageal pressure has also been found to be effective in helping to treat esophageal food impaction and foreign body obstructions in the esophagus.

=== Tolerance ===
After long-term use for chronic conditions, nitrate tolerance—tolerance to agents such as nitroglycerin—may develop in a patient, reducing its effectiveness. Tolerance is defined as the loss of symptomatic and hemodynamic effects of nitroglycerin or the need for higher doses of the drug to achieve the same effects, and was first described soon after the introduction of nitroglycerin in cardiovascular therapy. Studies have shown that nitrate tolerance is associated with vascular abnormalities which have the potential to worsen patients' prognosis. These include endothelial and autonomic dysfunction. The mechanisms of nitrate tolerance have been investigated over the last 30 years, and several hypotheses to explain tolerance have been offered, including:

1. plasma volume expansion
2. impaired transformation of nitroglycerin into NO or related species
3. counteraction of nitroglycerin vasodilation by neurohormonal activation
4. oxidative stress

== Adverse events ==
Nitroglycerin can cause severe hypotension, reflex tachycardia, and severe headaches that necessitate analgesic intervention for pain relief, the painful nature of which can have a marked negative effect on patient compliance.

Nitroglycerin also can cause severe hypotension, circulatory collapse, and death if used together with vasodilator drugs that are used for erectile dysfunction, such as sildenafil, tadalafil, and vardenafil.

Nitroglycerin transdermal patches should be removed before defibrillation due to the risk of explosion or burns, but investigations have concluded that nitroglycerin patch explosions during defibrillation were due to the breakdown voltage of the metal mesh in some patches.

== Mechanism of action ==
Nitroglycerin is a prodrug which must be denitrated, with the nitrite anion or a related species further reduced to produce the active metabolite nitric oxide (NO). Organic nitrates that undergo these two steps within the body are called nitrovasodilators, and the denitration and reduction occur via a variety of mechanisms. The mechanism by which such nitrates produce NO is widely disputed. It has been postulated that organic nitrates produce NO by reacting with sulfhydryl groups, while others believe that enzymes such as glutathione S-transferases, cytochrome P450 (CYP), and xanthine oxidoreductase are the primary source of nitroglycerin bioactivation.

The NO produced by this process is a potent activator of guanylyl cyclase (GC) by heme-dependent mechanisms; this activation results in formation of cyclic guanosine monophosphate (cGMP) from guanosine triphosphate (GTP). Among other roles, cGMP serves as a substrate for a cGMP-dependent protein kinase that activates myosin light chain phosphatase. Thus, production of NO from exogenous sources such as nitroglycerin increases the level of cGMP within the cell, and stimulates dephosphorylation of myosin, which initiates relaxation of smooth muscle cells in blood vessels.

== History ==
It was known almost from the time of the first synthesis of nitroglycerin by Ascanio Sobrero in 1846 that handling and tasting of nitroglycerin could cause sudden intense headaches, which suggested a vasodilation effect. Constantine Hering developed a form of nitroglycerin in 1847 and advocated for its dosing as a treatment of a number of diseases; however, its use as a specific treatment for blood pressure and chest pain was not among these. This is primarily due to his deep rooted focus in homeopathy.

Following Thomas Brunton's discovery that amyl nitrite could be used to treat chest pain, William Murrell experimented with the use of nitroglycerin to alleviate angina and reduce blood pressure, and showed that the accompanying headaches occurred as a result of overdose. Murrell began treating patients with small doses of nitroglycerin in 1878, and the substance was widely adopted after he published his results in The Lancet in 1879.

The medical establishment used the name "glyceryl trinitrate" or "trinitrin" to avoid alarming patients, because of a general awareness that nitroglycerin was explosive.

Overdoses may generate methemoglobinemia.

== Society and culture ==
=== Brand names ===
In the United States, the tablet form of nitroglycerin is marketed (brand name Nitrostat) by Viatris after Upjohn was spun off from Pfizer.

Nitroglycerin used for treatment of angina has multiple brand names depending on the mode of administration, such as Minitran, Nitro-Dur, Nitrolingual, Nitromist, and Nitro-Bid. The brand name Nitro-bid is an ointment form of Nitroglycerin that is applied twice daily to the skin, hence the name, where "BID" indicates "twice daily" (B.I.D).
