= Cloridarol =

Chemical compound

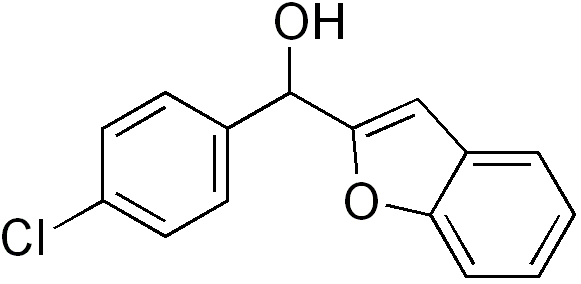

Clinical data
- ATC code: C01DX15 (WHO)

Identifiers
- IUPAC name: (RS)-1-Benzofuran-2-yl-(4-chlorophenyl)methanol
- CAS Number: 3611-72-1
- PubChem CID: 71132
- ChemSpider: 64279
- UNII: 2L2063955H
- KEGG: D07160
- ChEMBL: ChEMBL2104094
- CompTox Dashboard (EPA): DTXSID70863220
- ECHA InfoCard: 100.020.710

Chemical and physical data
- Formula: C_{15}H_{11}ClO_{2}
- Molar mass: 258.70 g·mol^{−1}
- 3D model (JSmol): Interactive image
- SMILES: c1cc(Cl)ccc1C(O)C2=Cc3ccccc3O2
- InChI: InChI=1S/C15H11ClO2/c16-12-7-5-10(6-8-12)15(17)14-9-11-3-1-2-4-13(11)18-14/h1-9,15,17H; Key:KBFBRIPYVVGWRS-UHFFFAOYSA-N

Cloridarol (or clobenfurol) is a vasodilator.
