= Arbutamine =

Chemical compound

Clinical data
- ATC code: C01CA22 (WHO)

Identifiers
- IUPAC name: 4-[(1R)-1-hydroxy-2-{[4-(4-hydroxyphenyl)butyl]amino}ethyl]benzene-1,2-diol
- CAS Number: 128470-16-6
- PubChem CID: 60789
- DrugBank: DB01102
- ChemSpider: 54785
- UNII: B07L15YAEV
- ChEBI: CHEBI:50580
- ChEMBL: ChEMBL1201251
- CompTox Dashboard (EPA): DTXSID00155908

Chemical and physical data
- Formula: C_{18}H_{23}NO_{4}
- Molar mass: 317.385 g·mol^{−1}
- 3D model (JSmol): Interactive image
- SMILES: Oc1ccc(cc1O)[C@@H](O)CNCCCCc2ccc(O)cc2
- InChI: InChI=1S/C18H23NO4/c20-15-7-4-13(5-8-15)3-1-2-10-19-12-18(23)14-6-9-16(21)17(22)11-14/h4-9,11,18-23H,1-3,10,12H2/t18-/m0/s1; Key:IIRWWTKISYTTBL-SFHVURJKSA-N

Arbutamine is a cardiac stimulant. It stimulates β adrenergic receptors.
