= Itramin tosilate =

Chemical compound

Clinical data
- Trade names: Nilatil
- Other names: Itramin tosylate
- ATC code: C01DX01 (WHO)

Identifiers
- IUPAC name: 2-aminoethyl nitrate; 4-methylbenzenesulfonic acid
- CAS Number: 13445-63-1
- PubChem CID: 26000
- DrugBank: DBSALT002523
- ChemSpider: 24219
- UNII: W9H0R50KY0
- KEGG: D07157
- ChEBI: CHEBI:136001
- ChEMBL: ChEMBL2106780
- CompTox Dashboard (EPA): DTXSID30158705

Chemical and physical data
- Formula: C_{9}H_{14}N_{2}O_{6}S
- Molar mass: 278.28 g·mol^{−1}
- 3D model (JSmol): Interactive image
- SMILES: CC1=CC=C(C=C1)S(=O)(=O)O.C(CO[N+](=O)[O-])N
- InChI: InChI=1S/C7H8O3S.C2H6N2O3/c1-6-2-4-7(5-3-6)11(8,9)10;3-1-2-7-4(5)6/h2-5H,1H3,(H,8,9,10);1-3H2; Key:HPPBBWMYZVALRK-UHFFFAOYSA-N

Itramin tosilate (INN), or itramin tosylate (more commonly), is a vasodilator.
