= Tiazotic acid =

Antioxidant

Clinical data
- Trade names: Thiotriazoline; Tiokor

Identifiers
- IUPAC name: 2-[(5-Methyl-1H-1,2,4-triazol-3-yl)sulfanyl]acetic acid
- CAS Number: 64679-65-8 357172-63-5 (morpholine salt)
- PubChem CID: 254566
- UNII: YEZ00M9XKN
- KEGG: D10852
- ChEMBL: ChEMBL1487672
- CompTox Dashboard (EPA): DTXSID40214967
- ECHA InfoCard: 100.244.688

Chemical and physical data
- Formula: C_{5}H_{7}N_{3}O_{2}S
- Molar mass: 173.19 g·mol^{−1}
- 3D model (JSmol): Interactive image
- SMILES: CC1=NC(=NN1)SCC(=O)O
- InChI: InChI=InChI=1S/C5H7N3O2S/c1-3-6-5(8-7-3)11-2-4(9)10/h2H2,1H3,(H,9,10)(H,6,7,8); Key:OJUNWHNRDPRNBR-UHFFFAOYSA-N

Tiazotic acid (brand names Thiotriazoline and Tiokor) is an antioxidant. It is used as a pharmaceutical drug for the treatment of ischemic heart disease in Russia, Ukraine, and Uzbekistan.

It is used as its salt with morpholine.

It has been studied for its potential to improve the cardiac effects of COVID-19.
