= Hydralazine =

Anti-hypertension medication

- Skeletal structure of hydralazine

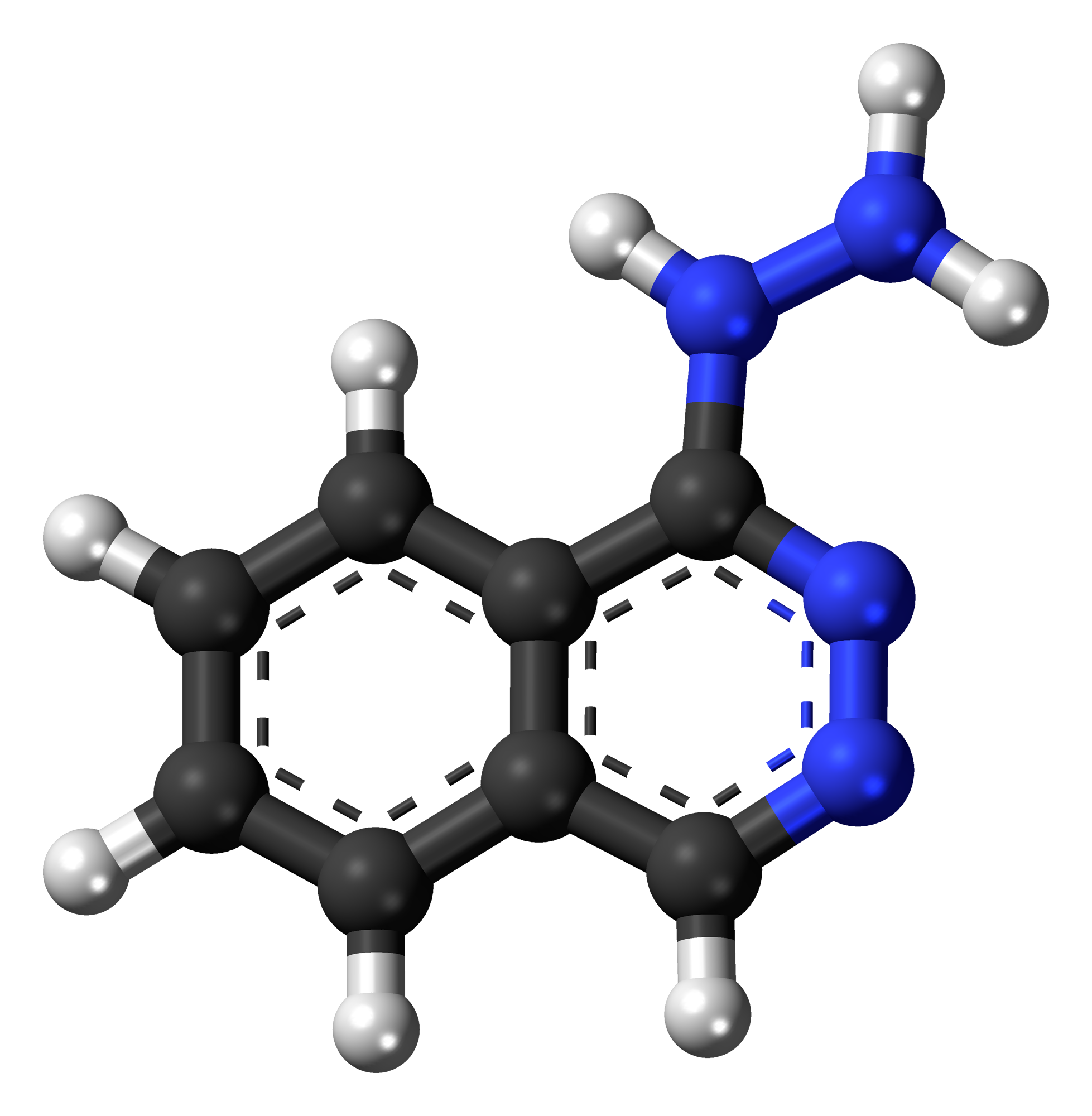

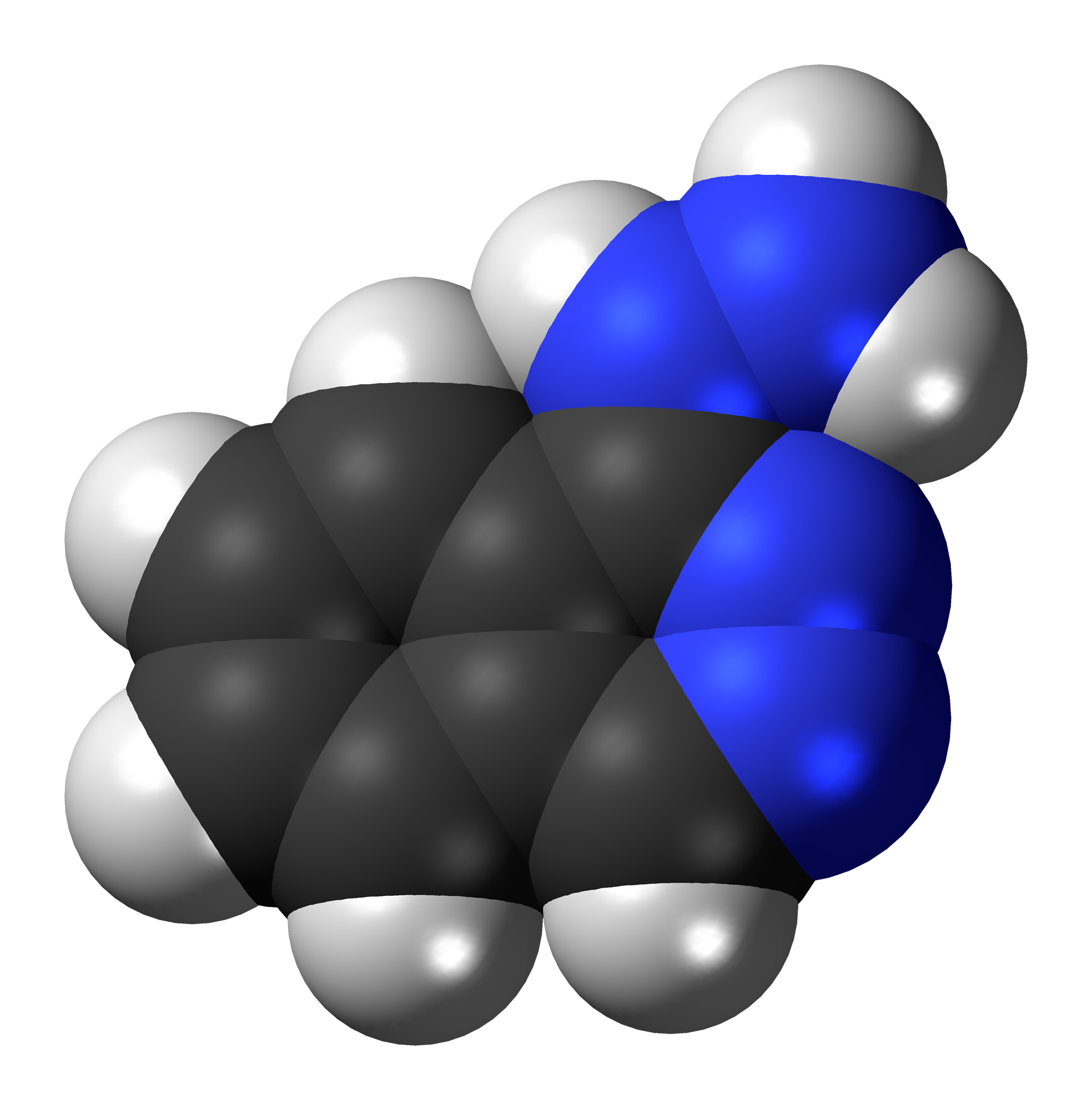
Left: Ball-and-stick model Right: Space-filling model

Clinical data
- Trade names: Apresoline, BiDil, others
- AHFS/Drugs.com: Monograph
- MedlinePlus: a682246
- License data: US DailyMed: Hydralazine
- Pregnancy category: AU: C
- Routes of administration: By mouth, intravenous
- ATC code: C02DB02 (WHO)

Legal status
- Legal status: AU: S4 (Prescription only); CA: ℞-only; UK: POM (Prescription only); US: ℞-only

Pharmacokinetic data
- Bioavailability: 26–50%
- Protein binding: 85–90%
- Metabolism: Liver
- Onset of action: 5–30 minutes
- Elimination half-life: 2–8 hours, 7–16 hours (renal impairment)
- Duration of action: 2–6 hours
- Excretion: Urine

Identifiers
- IUPAC name: 1-hydrazinylphthalazine
- CAS Number: 86-54-4
- PubChem CID: 3637
- IUPHAR/BPS: 7326
- DrugBank: DB01275
- ChemSpider: 3511
- UNII: 26NAK24LS8
- KEGG: D08044
- ChEBI: CHEBI:5775
- ChEMBL: ChEMBL276832
- CompTox Dashboard (EPA): DTXSID4023129
- ECHA InfoCard: 100.001.528

Chemical and physical data
- Formula: C_{8}H_{8}N_{4}
- Molar mass: 160.180 g·mol^{−1}
- 3D model (JSmol): Interactive image
- SMILES: NNc1c2ccccc2cnn1
- InChI: InChI=1S/C8H8N4/c9-11-8-7-4-2-1-3-6(7)5-10-12-8/h1-5H,9H2,(H,11,12); Key:RPTUSVTUFVMDQK-UHFFFAOYSA-N

Hydralazine, sold under the brand name Apresoline among others, is a medication used to treat high blood pressure and heart failure. This includes high blood pressure in pregnancy and very high blood pressure resulting in symptoms. It has been found to be particularly useful in heart failure, together with isosorbide dinitrate, for treatment of people of African descent. It is given by mouth or by injection into a vein. Effects usually begin around 15 minutes and last up to six hours.

Common side effects include headache and fast heart rate. It is not recommended in people with coronary artery disease or in those with rheumatic heart disease that affects the mitral valve. In those with kidney disease a low dose is recommended. Hydralazine is in the vasodilator family of medications, so it is believed to work by causing the dilation of blood vessels.

Hydralazine was discovered while scientists at Ciba were looking for a treatment for malaria. It was patented in 1949. It is on the World Health Organization's List of Essential Medicines. In 2023, it was the 109th most commonly prescribed medication in the United States, with more than 6 million prescriptions.

== Medical use ==
Hydralazine is not used as a primary drug for treating hypertension because it elicits a reflex sympathetic stimulation of the heart (the baroreceptor reflex). The sympathetic stimulation may increase heart rate and cardiac output, and in people with coronary artery disease may cause angina pectoris or myocardial infarction. Hydralazine may also increase plasma renin concentration, resulting in fluid retention. To prevent these undesirable side effects, hydralazine is usually prescribed in combination with a beta blocker (e.g., propranolol) and a diuretic.

Hydralazine is used to treat severe hypertension, but is not a first-line therapy for essential hypertension. Hydralazine is often used to treat hypertension in pregnancy together with either labetalol and/or methyldopa.

Hydralazine is commonly used in combination with isosorbide dinitrate for the treatment of congestive heart failure in black populations. This preparation, isosorbide dinitrate/hydralazine, was the first race-based prescription drug.

It should not be used in people who have tachycardia, heart failure, constrictive pericarditis, lupus, a dissecting aortic aneurysm, or porphyria.

== Adverse effects ==
Prolonged treatment may cause a syndrome similar to lupus, which can become fatal if the symptoms are not noticed and drug treatment stopped. Hydralazine is within the top three drugs that is known to induce systemic lupus and this adverse drug event is dose dependent yet significant.

Very common (>10% frequency) side effects include headache, tachycardia, and palpitations.

Common (1–10% frequency) side effects include flushing, hypotension, anginal symptoms, aching or swelling joints, muscle aches, positive tests for atrial natriuretic peptide, stomach upset, diarrhea, nausea and vomiting, and swelling (sodium and water retention).

== Interactions ==
Hydralazine may potentiate the antihypertensive effects of:

- ACE inhibitors
- Antihypertensives
- Antipsychotics
- Calcium antagonists
- Diazoxide
- Diuretics
- Ethanol (alcohol)
- Tricyclic antidepressants
- Vasodilators

Drugs subject to a strong first-pass effect, such as beta blockers, may increase the bioavailability of hydralazine. The heart rate-accelerating effects of epinephrine (adrenaline) are increased by hydralazine, and coadministration may lead to toxicity.

== Mechanism of action ==
Hydralazine is a direct-acting smooth muscle relaxant and acts as a vasodilator primarily in resistance arterioles, also known as the smooth muscle of the arterial bed. The molecular mechanism involves inhibition of inositol trisphosphate-induced Ca^{2+} release from the sarcoplasmic reticulum in arterial smooth muscle cells. By relaxing vascular smooth muscle, vasodilators act to decrease peripheral resistance, thereby lowering blood pressure and decreasing afterload. The exact mechanism of action of hydralazine is unknown, at least as of 1981.

Metabolic products include the N-acetyl derivative, pyruvic acid hydrazone, and acetone hydrazone, each of which may also contribute to reducing blood pressure.

== Chemistry ==
Hydralazine belongs to the hydrazinophthalazine class of drugs.

== History ==
The antihypertensive activity of hydralazine was discovered by scientists at Ciba, who were trying to discover drugs to treat malaria; it was initially called C-5968 and 1-hydrazinophthalazine; Ciba's patent application was filed in 1945 and issued in 1949, and the first scientific publications of its blood pressure-lowering activities appeared in 1950. It was approved by the FDA in 1953.

It was one of the first antihypertensive medications that could be taken by mouth.

== Research ==
Hydralazine has also been studied as a treatment for myelodysplastic syndrome in its capacity as a DNA methyltransferase inhibitor.
