= Cardiotonic agent =

Class of heart medication

Cardiotonic agents, also known as positive inotropes or cardiac stimulants, have a positive impact on the myocardium (muscular layer of the heart) by enhancing its contractility. Unlike general inotropes, these agents exhibit a higher level of specificity as they selectively target the myocardium.

They can be categorised into four distinct groups based on their unique mechanisms of action: cardiac glycosides, β-adrenergic agonists, phosphodiesterase III inhibitors, and calcium sensitizers. Certain medications, such as milrinone and digoxin, possess overlapping classifications due to their ability to engage multiple mechanisms of action.

Their inotropic properties make cardiotonic agents critical in addressing inadequate perfusion, and acute heart failure conditions including cardiogenic shock, as well as for long-term management of heart failure. These conditions arise when the heart's ability to meet the body's needs is compromised.

== Classification ==
=== Cardiac glycosides ===
==== Mechanism of action ====
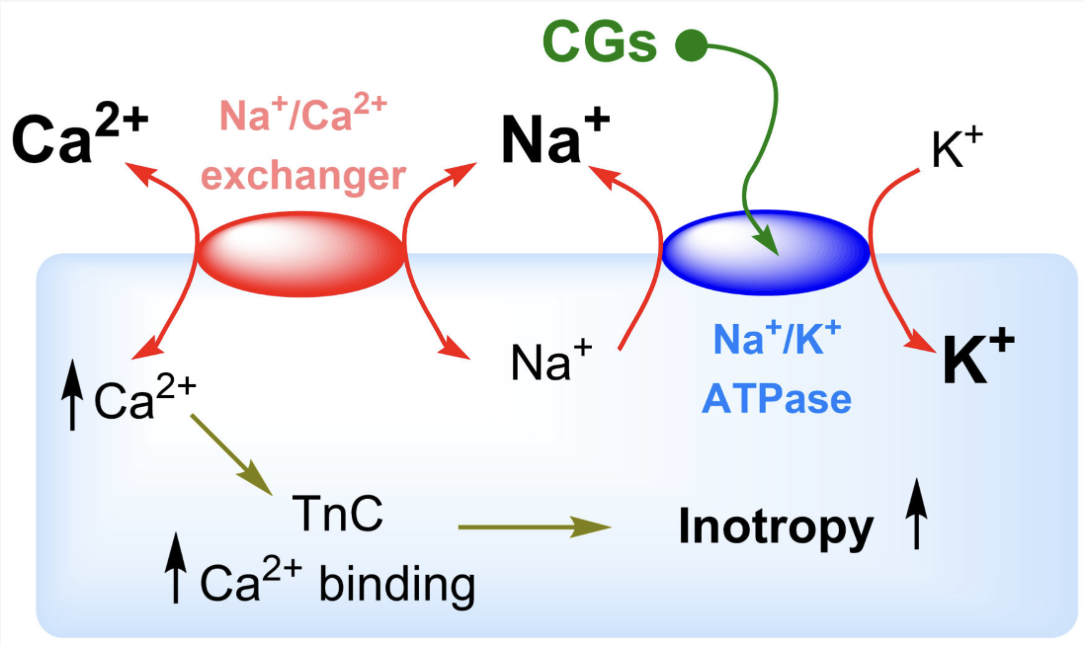
Mechanism of action of cardiac glycosides (Digitalis): inhibition of Na^{+}/K^{+} ATPase

Cardiac glycosides like digoxin, primarily inhibit the sodium-potassium pump (Na^{+}/K^{+} ATPase), an important protein located on the surface of cardiomyocytes (cardiac muscle cells). Using ATP (the cell's energy currency), this protein facilitates the transport of extracellular potassium ions (K^{+}) into the cell while exporting sodium ions (Na^{+}) out, maintaining a balanced 1:1 exchange. Thus, when this protein is blocked, Na^{+} accumulates within cardiomyocytes.

Moreover, cardiomyocytes possess another surface protein known as the sodium-calcium (Na^{+}/Ca^{2+}) exchanger. The accumulation of Na^{+} prompts its efflux from the cell, whilst concurrently allowing Ca^{2+} influx through this exchanger. Consequently, intracellular Ca^{2+} levels rise.

The interaction between Ca^{2+} and troponin C (TnC) is significant, as it prepares muscle fibres for the sliding filament mechanism, which explains muscle contraction. With increased Ca^{2+} levels, interactions between Ca^{2+} and TnC intensify, leading to stronger contractions of the myocardiocytes. Therapeutic doses of cardiac glycosides have been shown to enhance cardiac contractility, benefiting patients with impaired cardiac function, such as those with heart failure.

==== Pharmacotherapy profile ====
Drug examples	General indications	Common side effects	Cautions	Special populations
Digoxin Digitalis Digitoxin	Heart failure with reduced ejection fraction Atrial fibrillation	Dizziness Nausea Diarrhoea Skin rashes Vision disorders Arrhythmias Vomiting	Impaired renal function Thyroid disorders Acute coronary syndrome (blood flow to heart muscle suddenly blocked) Electrolyte disorders (hypercalcemia, hypokalemia, hypomagnesemia)	Pregnancy: can be used, may require dosage adjustment Breastfeeding: amount found in breast milk is insignificant, harm caused to foetus not well studied Renally impaired: consider reducing initial and maintenance doses

=== Beta-adrenergic agonists ===
==== Mechanism of action ====
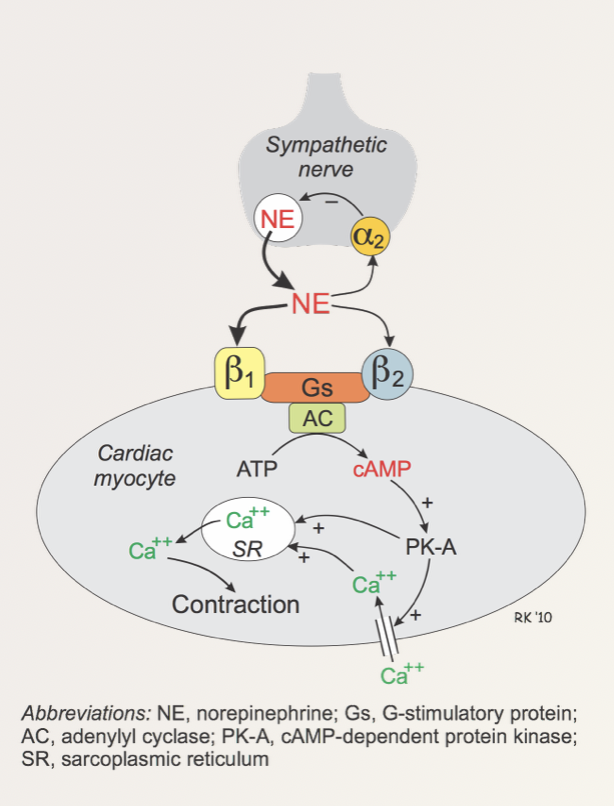
General mechanism of action of beta-adrenergic agonists: activation of β1 and β2 receptors

Naturally produced hormones norepinephrine and epinephrine or synthetic drugs such as dobutamine can be collectively regarded as beta-agonists. Specifically, dobutamine selectively binds to β1 receptors located on the surface of specialised cardiac muscle cells. Relative to β2 receptors, β1 is the predominant type in terms of quantity and function within the heart.

Gs proteins are a subunit of a large family of receptors called G-protein-coupled receptors (GPCRs). Due to the coupling nature between β1, Gs proteins, and the enzyme adenylyl cyclase, activation of Gs proteins ultimately activates adenylyl cyclase, which is responsible for converting ATP into cAMP. Thus, beta-agonists will lead to elevated cAMP levels, which further activate a cAMP-dependent protein called protein-kinase A (PK-A). PK-A plays a pivotal role in increasing intracellular Ca^{2+} levels through 2 mechanisms:

- Phosphorylation of L-type Ca^{2+} channels results in their activation, leading to extracellular Ca^{2+} influx into cardiac myocytes.
- Phosphorylation at specific sites on the sarcoplasmic reticulum (SR), which is a compartment within cells that acts as the Ca^{2+} storage site. Phosphorylation results in the activation of ryanodine receptors (RyRs) on the surface of SR, resulting in Ca^{2+} release from this compartment into the cytosol (the universal fluid that bathes the different compartments inside cells)

Similar to the mechanism of action of cardiac glycosides, elevated Ca^{2+} eventually translates into stronger cardiac contractile force.

==== Pharmacotherapy profile ====
Drug examples	General indications	Common side effects	Precautions	Special populations
Epinephrine Norepinephrine Dopamine Dobutamine Isoproterenol	Anaphylaxis Cardiogenic shock Cardiac arrest Severe hypotension Decompensated heart failure Atrioventricular block (malfunction in heart's electrical system)	Arrhythmias (abnormal heart rhythm) Chest pain Hypertension Palpitations Anxiety	Myocardial infarction (heart attack) Atherosclerosis (clogging of blood vessel wall) Arrhythmias Diabetes mellitus	Immediate use in cardiogenic shock or severe hypotension at risk of organ damage

=== Phosphodiesterase (III) inhibitors ===
==== Mechanism of action ====
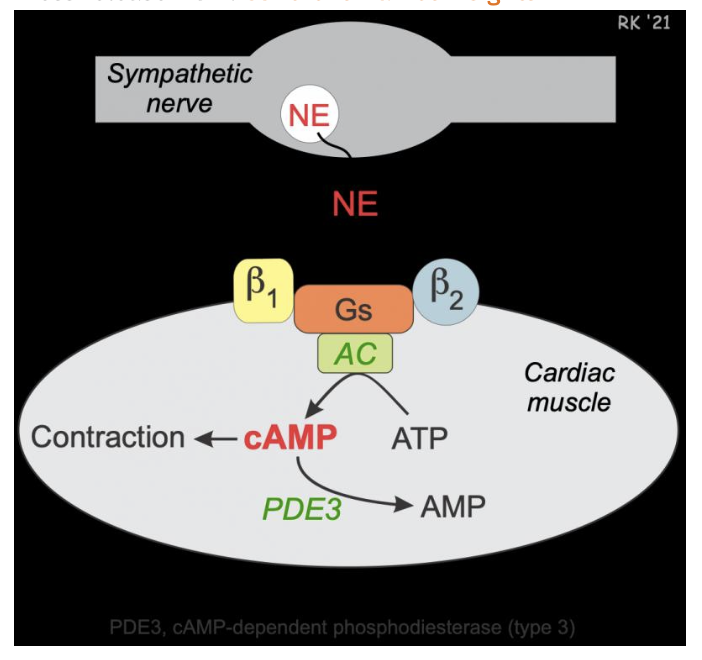
Mechanism of action of PDE III inhibitors: inhibition of PDE3 enzyme

PDE3 inhibitors exert their effects by blocking the activity of an enzyme called PDE3. This enzyme is responsible for breaking down a molecule called cAMP, which is the key signalling molecule in our body. When PDE3 is inhibited, the breakdown of cAMP is prevented, leading to increased levels of cAMP in our cells.

In our heart muscle cells, when the levels of cAMP rise, it activates a protein called protein kinase A (PKA). PKA acts as a switch, triggering a cascade of events that enhance the strength and efficiency of the heart's contractions. This ultimately leads to improved cardiac function.

PDE3 inhibitors also have an impact on the smooth muscles found in our blood vessels. By increasing cAMP levels, these medications cause the smooth muscles to relax. This relaxation has a significant benefit in our blood vessels as it leads to vasodilation, which means the blood vessels widen. Vasodilation helps to reduce resistance against blood flow, allowing for better circulation throughout the body.

Furthermore, PDE3 inhibitors exhibit an additional effect on platelets, which are small cell fragments involved in blood clotting. Increased levels of cAMP in platelets prevent their activation and reduce their ability to form blood clots. By inhibiting platelet aggregation, PDE3 inhibitors contribute to maintaining healthy and smooth blood flow.

==== Pharmacotherapy profile ====
Drug examples	Indications	Common side effects	Precautions	Special populations
Anagrelide Cilostazol Milrinone	Heart failure Pulmonary hypertension in babies Peripheral vascular disease Asthma Chronic obstructive pulmonary disease (COPD)	Gastrointestinal discomfort Tachycardia (heart rate too fast) Rapid drop in weight Headaches Dizziness Insomnia Psychological disorder (for example anxiety)	Compromised liver or kidney function with drugs that inhibit an enzyme called CYP3A4 Pre-existing ophthalmopathy (eye disorders)	Avoid usage during pregnancy as it can inhibit meiosis, a specific form of cell division that takes place in oocytes, which are specialized reproductive cells in females

=== Calcium sensitisers ===
==== Mechanism of action ====
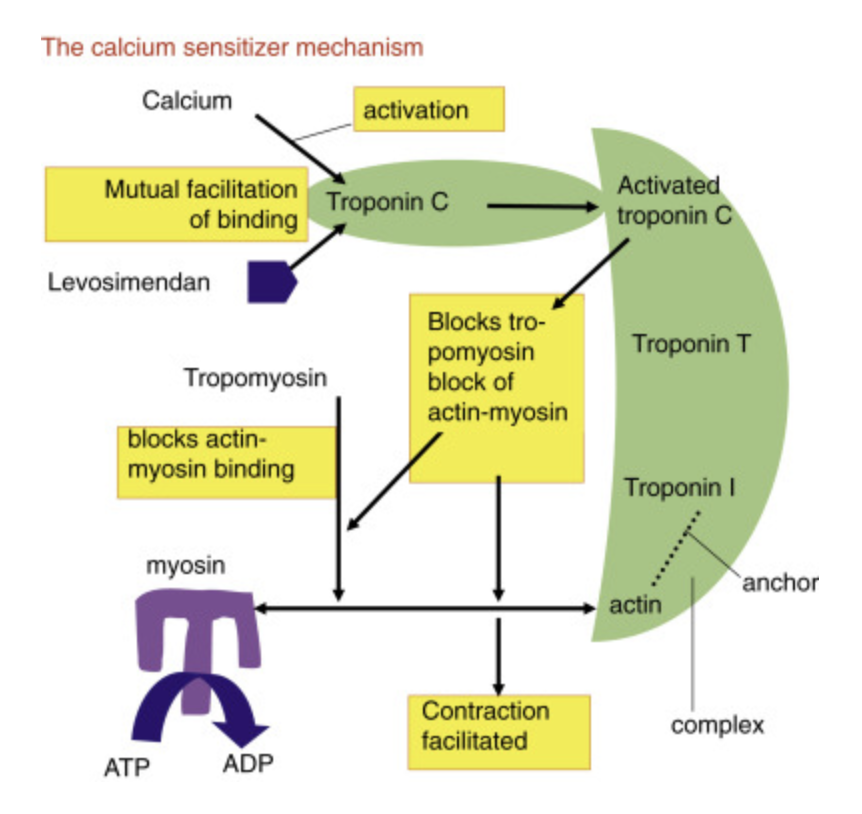
Mechanism of action of calcium sensitizers: increase sensitivity of troponin C to Ca^{2+}

Calcium is a vital element for regulating the contraction and relaxation of the heart muscle. Calcium sensitizers are medications that increase the responsiveness of heart muscle cells to calcium, enabling more forceful contractions while conserving energy. Contraction of the heart muscle relies on electrical signals that trigger the release of calcium ions. These calcium ions bind to a protein called troponin, which initiates the process of muscle contraction.

Calcium sensitizers function by binding to cardiac troponin C, thereby enhancing the sensitivity of heart muscle cells to naturally occurring calcium ions. This heightened sensitivity fosters a more efficient interaction between calcium and the contractile apparatus of the heart muscle. Consequently, calcium can more effectively bind to actin-myosin filaments, resulting in stronger contractions without excessive calcium accumulation. By reducing strain on the heart, this mechanism helps minimise the oxygen demand.

Furthermore, calcium sensitizers provide an additional benefit. They open potassium channels in the heart muscle cells, resulting in vasodilation and improved blood flow. This action reduces the workload on the heart.

==== Pharmacotherapy profile ====
Drug examples	Indications	Common side effects	Precautions	Special populations
Levosimendan Milrinone Digoxin	Heart failure (but no significant reduction in mortality) Cardiogenic Shock Pulmonary Hypertension Post-Cardiac Surgery	Isolated tongue swelling Headache Nausea Palpitation Injection site irritation	Renal and hepatic impairment Electrolyte imbalance Patients with prolong QT wave in ECG (abnormal repolarize time of heart)	Compelling indication in elderly patients with heart failure Positive effects in improving cardiac functions in paediatric (young) patients

== Clinical role in heart failure ==
Cardiotonic agents are typically employed as short-term and non-routine therapies for heart failure patients. They are specifically reserved for those with contractile dysfunction in the left ventricles (lower chambers of the heart), low cardiac output, and low blood pressure, placing them at risk of inadequate organ perfusion. While these agents assist in promoting perfusion, their potential for increased mortality and adverse side effects necessitates cautious administration at initially low doses, with careful adjustments under close monitoring. Given the diverse presentations of heart failure and individual patient characteristics, cardiotonic medication uses and preferences vary.

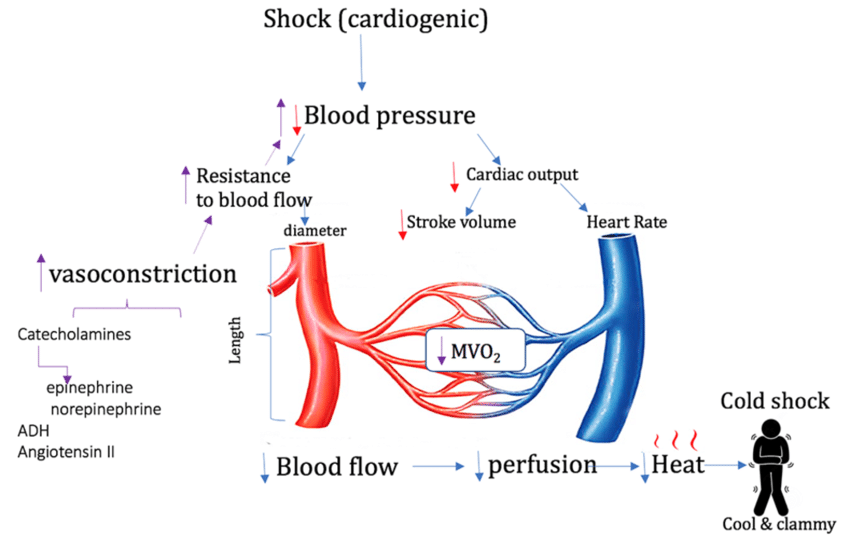
Cardiogenic shock leads to many harmful physiological effects

Specifically, in patients experiencing inadequate blood perfusion (with blood pressure below 80 mmHg), the American Heart Association / American College of Cardiology (ACC/AHA), recommends the use of Dobutamine and Milrinone. Whereas in clinically stable patients with sufficient perfusion, cardiac inotrope use is advised against. This caution is due to the heightened risk of adverse cardiovascular outcomes, including arrhythmias, detrimental heart structure remodelling, and even mortality. Heart failure can manifest in its life-threatening form of cardiogenic shock, with hypotension and low blood flow (hypoperfusion), placing the patient at risk of multiorgan failure. In cardiogenic shock management, cardiotonic agents serve 2 functions. Norepinephrine, epinephrine, dopamine, and phenylephrine contribute mainly through their vasopressor (vasoconstrictive) functions to constrict blood vessels to correct hypotension. Whereas, dobutamine, milrinone, enoximone, and levosimendan, act to restore the heart's pumping function. To prevent further harm to the organs, cardiotonic agents are typically administered alongside oxygen, ventilatory support, and mechanical circulatory support (MCS). As hypoperfusion and organ dysfunction improve, it is recommended to gradually reduce the administration of these agents. However, certain patients who are unable to discontinue cardiotonic agents without experiencing recurrent heart failure symptoms, known as inotropic-dependent patients, may require prolonged usage. This serves as a bridge towards more invasive management approaches, such as transplants or left ventricular assist devices (medical device to assist the heart).

Heart failure patients are stratified based on their left ventricular ejection fraction, which quantifies the volume of blood expelled from the heart's lower chambers (ventricles) with each contraction. According to the European Society of Cardiology (ESC), among cardiotonic agents, Digoxin is specifically recommended as a second-line option for patients with an abnormal left ventricular ejection fraction (≤40%). Digoxin helps alleviate symptoms and reduce hospitalizations related to heart failure, but it does not offer any mortality-reducing benefits. Digoxin may be considered in patients who remain symptomatic despite receiving treatment with a first-line combination of an ACE inhibitor (or ARNI), a beta-blocker, and a mineralocorticoid receptor antagonist (MRA). It is also considered in patients with atrial fibrillation - a heart rhythm disorder characterised by irregular electrical impulses in the atria (the upper chambers of the heart). This abnormal electrical activity causes the atria to contract erratically, resulting in an irregular heartbeat. Treatment primarily focuses on restoring normal heart rhythm and controlling the heart rate to minimise the risk of complications, including stroke. According to the ACC/AHA guidelines, intravenous digoxin (cardiac glycoside) can be used in atrial fibrillation (Afib) to assist heartbeats. In multicenter randomised controlled trials, intravenous digoxin was shown to be effective in controlling the heart rate compared to a placebo.
