= Cardiac stimulant =

Class of chemical compound

A cardiac stimulant is a drug which acts as a stimulant of the heart to increase cardiac output. They can work via positive chronotropic action (increased heart rate) and/or positive inotropic action (increased myocardial contractility).

Within positive inotropes, there are calcium mobilizers and calcium sensitizers. Calcium mobilizers are conventional positive inotropes that elevate intracellular calcium, whereas calcium sensitizers do not elevated intracellular calcium but instead increase sensitivity to it.

Cardiac stimulants are known to be used (and banned) as performance-enhancing drugs, including for doping in sport.

== Examples ==
- Sympathomimetics
  - β_{1}-Adrenergic receptor agonists like epinephrine, norepinephrine, dopamine, dobutamine, denopamine, isoproterenol, and xamoterol
  - Indirectly acting adrenergic agonists (via activation of β_{1}-adrenergic receptors)
    - Norepinephrine prodrugs like droxidopa (L-DOPS)
    - Norepinephrine reuptake inhibitors like atomoxetine, reboxetine, desipramine, nortriptyline, bupropion, milnacipran, methylphenidate, and cocaine
    - Norepinephrine releasing agents like amphetamine, methamphetamine, ephedrine, pseudoephedrine, phenylpropanolamine, and mephentermine
- Sympatholytics
  - α_{1}-Adrenergic receptor antagonists like phentolamine, prazosin, terazosin, and doxazosin
  - α_{2}-Adrenergic receptor antagonists like phentolamine, yohimbine, and atipamezole
- Antimuscarinic anticholinergics like atropine
- Adenosine receptor antagonists like caffeine, theophylline, and aminophylline
- Phosphodiesterase PDE3 inhibitors like amrinone, milrinone, and pimobendan
- Cardiac glycosides like digoxin
- Calcium sensitizers like levosimendan, pimobendan, and omecamtiv mecarbil
- Other agents like hydralazine and cannabinoids

Exercise is a cardiac stimulant by increasing levels of the sympathomimetic catecholamines epinephrine and norepinephrine.
