= Low cardiac output syndrome =

- Other names: LCOS; Decreased cardiac output; DCO
- Specialty: Cardiology

Low cardiac output syndrome (LCOS), or simply low cardiac output, also known as decreased cardiac output (DCO), is a transient cardiovascular syndrome in which cardiac output is below normal and acceptable limits. It can result in tissue hypoperfusion and associated symptoms. When complicated by multiorgan dysfunction due to hypoperfusion, LCOS is instead defined as cardiogenic shock (CS).

== Definition ==
Cardiac output (CO) is defined as the volume of blood that is pumped by the heart to the systemic circulation per minute and represents the total blood flow in the body. It can be calculated as cardiac output equals heart rate (HR) times stroke volume (SV). Cardiac index (CI) is CO adjusted or normalized by body size, and has the formula CO divided by body surface area (BSA). There is no absolute definition of LCOS, but definitions sometimes include a CI of less than 1.8 L/min/m^{2}, or less than 2.2 L/min/m^{2} with inotropic drugs.

== Causes ==
There are various different causes of LCOS, for instance shock, cardiac surgery, arrhythmias like bradycardia, and acute decompensated heart failure (ADHF), among others.

== Signs, symptoms, and diagnosis ==
Presenting signs and symptoms of LCOS include hypotension (systolic blood pressure of less than 90 mmHg for at least 30 minutes) and end-organ hypoperfusion such as cool extremities, low urine output of less than 30 mL/hour, altered mental status, or elevated lactate. Other signs and symptoms include tachycardia, narrow pulse pressure, other indications of poor perfusion like weak pulses and slow capillary refill time (CRT), and oliguria or anuria (low or absent urine output).

Defining characteristics of LCOS that occur with high frequency have been found to include altered heart rate/rhythm (77%), dyspnea (43–77%), labile blood pressure (69%), rales (69%), oliguria or anuria (62%), edema (61–71%), cold and/or clammy skin (53%), jugular vein distension (43%), fatigue and/or weakness (43–46%), decreased peripheral pulses (46%), and decreased peripheral perfusion (46%). Various other symptoms were also found to occur with lower frequency.

There is a continuum between LCOS and cardiogenic shock (CS). In CS, there is additionally multiorgan dysfunction. CS is an acute and life-threatening condition requiring immediate medical attention.

== Treatment ==
Little evidence is available to inform treatment of LCOS. Possible treatments may include inotropic agents and vasodilators. Examples of specific medications include the catecholamine sympathomimetics dopamine, dobutamine, epinephrine, norepinephrine, and isoprenaline (isoproterenol); the calcium sensitizer levosimendan; the phosphodiesterase PDE3 inhibitors amrinone, milrinone, and enoximone; and, in some subgroups, pure vasodilators like nitroglycerin, nitroprusside, or inhaled nitric oxide (NO).

== Research ==
The calcium sensitizer levosimendan and the HCN4 blocker ivabradine are under formal development for treatment of low cardiac output. Levosimendan is in phase 3 clinical trials for this indication, while ivabradine is in phase 2 trials.
