= Antihypotensive =

Substance that raises blood pressure

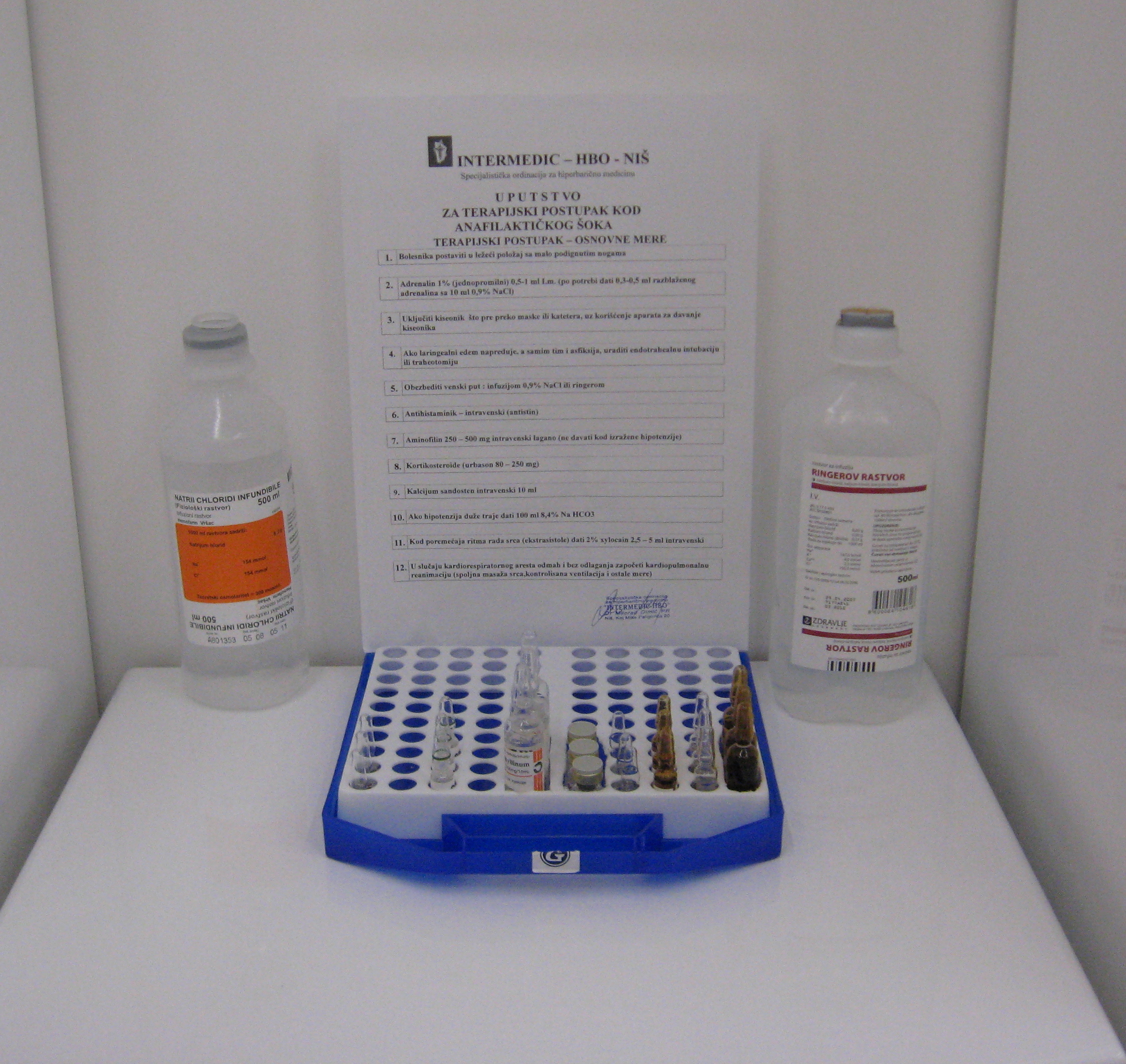
A set of medications used for anaphylactic shock in health institutions

An antihypotensive, also known as a vasopressor, is an agent that raises blood pressure by constricting blood vessels, thereby increasing systemic vascular resistance. This is different from inotropes which increase the force of cardiac contraction. Some substances do both (e.g. dopamine, dobutamine).

If low blood pressure is due to blood loss, then preparations increasing volume of blood circulation—plasma-substituting solutions such as colloid and crystalloid solutions (salt solutions)—will raise the blood pressure without any direct vasopressor activity. Packed red blood cells, plasma or whole blood should not be used solely for volume expansion or to increase oncotic pressure of circulating blood. Blood products should only be used if reduced oxygen carrying capacity or coagulopathy is present. Other causes of either absolute (dehydration, loss of plasma via wound/burns) or relative (third space losses) vascular volume depletion also respond, although blood products are only indicated if significantly anemic.

== Classification ==
Antihypotensive agents can be classified as follows:

- Sympathomimetics
  - Epinephrine
  - Noradrenaline
  - Phenylephrine
  - Dobutamine
  - Dopamine
  - Dopexamine
  - Ephedrine
  - Midodrine
  - Amezinium
  - Metaraminol
- Vasopressin
- Angiotensinamide
- S-alkylisothiouronium derivatives
  - Difetur
  - Izoturon
- Glucocorticoids and mineralocorticoids
  - Hydrocortisone
  - Prednisone, Prednisolone
  - Dexamethasone, Betamethasone
  - Fludrocortisone
- Positive inotropic agents
  - Cardiac glycosides
    - Strophantin K
    - Convallatoxin
    - Digoxin
  - PDE3 inhibitors
    - Amrinone
    - Enoximone
    - Milrinone
  - Levosimendan
