= Calcium sensitizer =

A calcium sensitizer is a drug which sensitizes the heart to intracellular calcium thereby increasing cardiac contractility. Examples include levosimendan, pimobendan, and omecamtiv mecarbil (CK-1827452).

Calcium sensitizers like levosimendan and pimobendan have multiple mechanisms of action and produce both positive inotropic effects and peripheral vasodilation. Conversely, the newer experimental agent omecamtiv mecarbil is a pure inotrope without other effects like vasodilation. Levosimendan and pimobendan augment cardiac troponin C binding to calcium in addition to other actions, whereas omecantiv mecarbil binds to the cardiac myosin β-heavy chain and thereby activates cardiac myosin. Calcium sensitizers are used in the treatment of heart failure. Levosimendan is widely used in humans (but notably not in the United States), while pimobendan is used in Japan and in veterinary medicine.

Calcium sensitizers should be distinguished from calcium mobilizers, which act by various mechanisms of action and work by elevating intracellular calcium levels to increase cardiac contractility. Examples of calcium mobilizers include catecholamine sympathomimetics like dobutamine, phosphodiesterase PDE3 inhibitors like amrinone, enoximone, and milrinone, and cardiac glycosides like digoxin. In heart failure, calcium mobilizers provide modest short-term benefits. However, with chronic administration, there is accelerated disease and increased mortality. Attempts to avoid such problems, like with reduced or intermittent dosing or use of partial agonists, have been unsuccessful. As a result, long-term use of calcium mobilizers for heart failure has been abandoned. In any case, they are still used for refractory cases of acute heart failure.

Calcium sensitizers are thought to be superior to and safer than calcium mobilizers as they avoid elevation of intracellular calcium, do not downregulate the adrenergic signaling pathway, and carry various other advantages. Levosimendan has shown short-term benefits for heart failure without long-term consequences, though more clinical trials are still needed. On the other hand, pimobendan has been reported to increase mortality similarly to other conventional inotropic agents, resulting in it being abandoned, though subsequent contradictory findings also exist.

== See also ==
- Cardiotonic agent § Calcium sensitisers
