= Levdobutamine =

Clinical data
- Other names: Levodobutamine; (S)-Dobutamine; LY-206243
- Drug class: Sympathomimetic; β_{1}-Adrenergic receptor agonist; Positive inotrope

Identifiers
- IUPAC name: 4-[2-[[(2S)-4-(4-hydroxyphenyl)butan-2-yl]amino]ethyl]benzene-1,2-diol
- CAS Number: 61661-06-1
- PubChem CID: 688441
- ChemSpider: 599903
- UNII: 0PE6UXH3WG
- ChEBI: CHEBI:59805
- ChEMBL: ChEMBL1367478
- CompTox Dashboard (EPA): DTXSID90210671

Chemical and physical data
- Formula: C_{18}H_{23}NO_{3}
- Molar mass: 301.386 g·mol^{−1}
- 3D model (JSmol): Interactive image
- SMILES: C[C@@H](CCC1=CC=C(C=C1)O)NCCC2=CC(=C(C=C2)O)O
- InChI: InChI=1S/C18H23NO3/c1-13(2-3-14-4-7-16(20)8-5-14)19-11-10-15-6-9-17(21)18(22)12-15/h4-9,12-13,19-22H,2-3,10-11H2,1H3/t13-/m0/s1; Key:JRWZLRBJNMZMFE-ZDUSSCGKSA-N

Levdobutamine (INN; developmental code name LY-206243; also known as (S)-dobutamine) is a sympathomimetic, selective β_{1}-adrenergic receptor agonist, and positive inotrope which was never marketed. It is the (S)-enantiomer of dobutamine.
