= Beta1-adrenergic agonist =

β_{1}-Adrenergic receptor agonists, also known as beta-1 agonists, are a class of drugs that bind selectively to the β_{1}-adrenergic receptor. As a result, they act more selectively upon the heart. β-Adrenoceptors typically bind to norepinephrine release by sympathetic adrenergic nerves and to circulating epinephrine. The effect of β-adrenoceptors is cardiac stimulation, such as increased heart rate, heart contractility, heart conduction velocity, and heart relaxation.

== Examples ==
Examples include:

- Denopamine (selective β_{1} agonist)
- Dobutamine (β_{1}>β_{2} agonist)
- Xamoterol (β_{1} partial agonist)
- Epinephrine (non-selective)
- Norepinephrine (non-selective)
- Isoprenaline (non-selective)

Norepinephrine reuptake inhibitors, like atomoxetine, methylphenidate, and cocaine, as well as norepinephrine releasing agents, like amphetamine, ephedrine, pseudoephedrine, and phenylpropanolamine, indirectly activate β_{1}-adrenergic receptors (as well as other adrenergic receptors) by increasing norepinephrine and/or epinephrine levels. As a result, they can be referred to as indirectly acting sympathomimetics.
