= Cilostazol =

Chemical compound

Clinical data
- Pronunciation: /sɪˈlɒstəzɒl/ sil-OS-tə-zol
- Trade names: Pletal
- AHFS/Drugs.com: Monograph
- MedlinePlus: a601038
- License data: US DailyMed: Cilostazol
- Routes of administration: By mouth (tablets)
- ATC code: B01AC23 (WHO)

Legal status
- Legal status: AU: S4 (Prescription only); UK: POM (Prescription only); US: ℞-only

Pharmacokinetic data
- Protein binding: 95–98%
- Metabolism: Liver (CYP3A4- and CYP2C19-mediated)
- Elimination half-life: 11–13 hours
- Excretion: Kidney

Identifiers
- IUPAC name: 6-[4-(1-Cyclohexyl-1H-tetrazol-5-yl)butoxy]- 3,4-dihydro-2(1H)-quinolinone
- CAS Number: 73963-72-1
- PubChem CID: 2754
- IUPHAR/BPS: 7148
- DrugBank: DB01166
- ChemSpider: 2652
- UNII: N7Z035406B
- KEGG: D01896
- ChEBI: CHEBI:31401
- ChEMBL: ChEMBL799
- CompTox Dashboard (EPA): DTXSID9045132
- ECHA InfoCard: 100.215.897

Chemical and physical data
- Formula: C_{20}H_{27}N_{5}O_{2}
- Molar mass: 369.469 g·mol^{−1}
- 3D model (JSmol): Interactive image
- SMILES: O=C4Nc3c(cc(OCCCCc1nnnn1C2CCCCC2)cc3)CC4
- InChI: InChI=1S/C20H27N5O2/c26-20-12-9-15-14-17(10-11-18(15)21-20)27-13-5-4-8-19-22-23-24-25(19)16-6-2-1-3-7-16/h10-11,14,16H,1-9,12-13H2,(H,21,26); Key:RRGUKTPIGVIEKM-UHFFFAOYSA-N

Cilostazol, sold under the brand name Pletal among others, is a medication used to help the symptoms of intermittent claudication in peripheral vascular disease. It may also be used to prevent stroke. It is taken by mouth.

Common side effects include headache, diarrhea, dizziness, and cough. Serious side effects may include decreased survival in those with heart failure, low platelets, and low white blood cells. Cilostazol is a phosphodiesterase 3 inhibitor which works by inhibiting platelet aggregation and dilating arteries.

Cilostazol was approved for medical use in the United States in 1999. It is available as a generic medication. In 2019, it was the 347th most commonly prescribed medication in the United States, with more than 800 thousand prescriptions.

== Research ==
=== Effects on longitudinal bone growth ===
Cilostazol has been investigated in preclinical models as a stimulator of endochondral bone growth. PDE3 is expressed in proliferating chondrocytes of the growth plate, and that Pde3b-knockout mice show enlargement of the tibia and other long bones. In embryonic mouse metatarsal explant cultures, cilostazol at 10 μM increased longitudinal outgrowth over four days, expanding the round and columnar chondrocyte zones and increasing alcian-blue-stained extracellular matrix; the PDE3 inhibitors milrinone, anagrelide and olprinone produced comparable effects, while inhibitors selective for PDE2 or PDE10 did not. When three-week-old C57BL/6 mice received daily intraperitoneal injections of cilostazol at 10 mg/kg for four weeks, naso-anal body length was significantly greater than in vehicle-treated controls, and a similar growth-promoting effect was observed in Fgfr3-transgenic mice, a model of achondroplasia.

Mechanistically, the authors proposed that PDE3 inhibition raises intracellular cyclic GMP in growth-plate chondrocytes — cilostazol-treated bones showed an approximately 1.7-fold increase in cGMP — activating protein kinase G, which phosphorylates plasma-membrane potassium channels. The resulting membrane hyperpolarisation is thought to enhance the driving force for TRPM7-mediated Ca²⁺ entry and thereby stimulate cartilage matrix synthesis, converging on the C-type natriuretic peptide (CNP) signalling axis targeted clinically by vosoritide. The authors suggested that PDE3 inhibitors might be repurposed for short-stature disorders such as achondroplasia, while cautioning that the findings are preclinical and that self-administration of cilostazol for growth purposes is unsupported and carries cardiovascular and bleeding risks.

== Medical uses ==
Cilostazol is approved for the treatment of intermittent claudication in the United States and United Kingdom. If no improvement is seen after 3 months, stopping the medication is reasonable.

Cilostazol is also used for secondary stroke prevention, though to date no regulatory body has approved it specifically for that indication.

=== Heart failure ===
Cilostazol is dangerous for people with severe heart failure. Cilostazol has been studied in people without heart failure, without evidence of harm, but much more data would be needed to determine no risk exists. Although cilostazol would not be approvable for a trivial condition the Cardio-Renal Advisory Committee and FDA concluded that fully informed patients and physicians should be able to choose to use it to treat intermittent claudication. Patient and physician labeling will describe the basis for concern and the incomplete information available.

== Adverse effects ==
Possible side effects of cilostazol use include headache (the most common), diarrhea, severe heat intolerance, abnormal stools, increased heart rate, and palpitations.

== Interactions ==
Cilostazol is metabolized by CYP3A4 and CYP2C19, two isoenzymes of the cytochrome P450 system. Drugs that inhibit CYP3A4, such as itraconazole, erythromycin, ketoconazole, and diltiazem, are known to interact with cilostazol. The proton pump inhibitor omeprazole, an inhibitor of CYP2C19, increases exposure to the active metabolite of cilostazol.

A single report has been made of grapefruit juice possibly increasing the effects of cilostazol; some drug information sources list this as a possible interaction. The FDA-approved labeling of cilostazol notes that grapefruit juice (which is a CYP3A4 inhibitor) increases the drug's maximum concentration by around 50%.

== Mechanism ==
Cilostazol is a selective inhibitor of phosphodiesterase type 3 (PDE_{3}) with therapeutic focus on increasing cAMP. An increase in cAMP results in an increase in the active form of protein kinase A (PKA), which is directly related with an inhibition in platelet aggregation. PKA also prevents the activation of an enzyme (myosin light-chain kinase) that is important in the contraction of smooth muscle cells, thereby exerting its vasodilatory effect.
