= C12H12N2O2S =

The molecular formula C_{12}H_{12}N_{2}O_{2}S (molar mass: 248.30 g/mol, exact mass: 248.0619 u) may refer to:

- Enoximone
- Dapsone, or diaminodiphenyl sulfone(DDS)
