= PDE3 inhibitor =

Chemical compound

Milrinone, one of the first PDE3 inhibitors used clinically

A PDE3 inhibitor is a drug which inhibits the action of the phosphodiesterase enzyme PDE3. They are used for the therapy of acute heart failure and cardiogenic shock.

PDE3 inhibitors produce dilation of resistance and capacitance blood vessels (thus decreasing both preload and afterload), and exhibit positive inotropy and chronotropy. PDE3 inhibitors potentiate the effects of beta-adrenergic agonists.

== Medical uses ==
=== Cardiac ===
Amrinone, milrinone and enoximone are used clinically for short-term treatment of cardiac failure in the presence of cardiogenic shock. PDE3 inhibitors may be preferred over catecholamines in patients with systemic or pulmonary hypertension, or in patients using beta blockers. Hypotension is often dose limiting; tachycardic and arrhythmogenic effects resemble those seen with catecholamines.

PDE3 inhibitors are indicated as inotropics for the therapy of acute heart failure if catecholamines are ineffective. However, well controlled studies have shown that PDE3 inhibitors generally increase mortality when used for the therapy of acute heart failure, so they have to be applied under close observation.

=== Peripheral artery disease ===
Cilostazol is used for the treatment of intermittent claudication. This drug has a much weaker positive inotropic effect than those drugs used for the therapy of acute heart failure, and lacks significant adverse cardiac effects.

== Contraindications ==
=== Cardiac ===
Contraindications are severe obstructive cardiomyopathy, hypovolemia, tachycardia, and ventricular aneurysm. Breast feeding is prohibited during treatment.

== Adverse effects ==
=== Cardiac ===
The most important adverse effects when used for the therapy of acute heart failure are arrhythmia, thrombocytopenia and increased transaminase levels.

== Types ==
Approved PDE3 inhibitors include the following:

- amrinone
- cilostazol
- milrinone
- enoximone
- pimobendan (approved for human use in Japan, approved for dogs elsewhere)

== Mechanism of action ==
PDE3 inhibitors are a type of phosphodiesterase inhibitors. Inhibition of the PDE isoenzyme 3 leads to an increase of intracellular concentrations of the second messenger cyclic adenosine monophosphate (cAMP). cAMP mediates the phosphorylation of protein kinases, which in turn activates cardiac calcium channels. An increased calcium influx from the sarcoplasmic reticulum (SR) during phase 2 (the plateau phase) of the cardiac action potential leads to a positive inotropic effect of PDE3 inhibitors: they increase the force of cardiac contraction. Increased reflux of calcium into the SR following the plateau phase is responsible for their positive lusitropic effect: they increase relaxation speed. Additionally, PDE3 inhibitors act as vasodilators.

== Chemical properties ==
=== First generation PDE3 inhibitors ===
Recognition that the knowledge about PDE could be used to develop drugs that were PDE inhibitors led to extensive research. Most studies used analogues of the nucleotide substrates or derivatives of natural product inhibitors such as xanthine (e.g. theophylline) and papaverine.

The active site of PDE3 can be considered as a summary of ideas about receptor topography resulting from the first generation inhibitors. The model of the Wells et al. version as cited in Erhardt and Chou (1991) includes the following:

1. A phosphate binding area
2. A lipophilic area that accommodates the non-polar side of the ribose moiety
3. A pyrimidine binding site
4. An imidazole binding site portion of the pyrimidine binding site
5. A sterically hindered site
6. An area with bulk tolerance

=== Second generation PDE3 inhibitors ===
Since selective PDE3 inhibitors were recognised to be cardiotonic drugs there has been great interest in developing new drugs in this category. A large number of heterocyclic compounds have been synthesized during related research. These compounds constitute a second generation of PDE inhibitors. Although they have been directed mostly at PDE3, they present significant structure-activity relationship for the PDEs in general.

H (heterocycle) – P (phenyl) – I (imidazole) pattern of CI-930

A "heterocycle-phenyl-imidazole" (H-P-I) pattern has been considered to be necessary for positive inotropic activity in cardiac muscle and many second generation inhibitors fit this pattern.

The heterocycle region: Within each heterocycle there is the presence of a dipole and an adjacent acid proton (an amide function). These atoms are believed to mimic the electrophilic center in the phosphate group in cAMP and are confirmed as the primary site of binding. The heterocycle is a transition state analogue inhibitor of PDE. Alkyl groups, limited to either methyl or ethyl, on the heterocyclic ring usually enhance potency, with occasional exceptions.

The phenyl region: It seems that an electron rich centre, such as phenyl, needs to be present. The beneficial effects of small alkyl groups on the heterocycle could be to twist the central ring away from exact coplanarity with the heterocyclic ring. There is a similar twist in cAMP and there is general agreement that high affinity PDE3 inhibitors should adopt an energetically favoured planar conformation that mimics the anti conformation of cAMP.

The imidazole region: Various substituents have been placed at the para-position of the central phenyl ring. They are electron rich moieties and apparently a positively charged moiety cannot be tolerated in this region of the PDE receptor. There is general agreement about this inhibitor potency: lactam ≥ alkyl-CONH- ≥ imidazoyl = pyridine in place of the central phenyl with its nitrogen in the analogous 4 position ≥ alkyl-S- > simple ether > halide = amine > imidazolium (which is totally inactive).

Identification of features common to the most selective inhibitors has led to a "five-point model" with:

1. Presence of a strong dipole (carbonyl moiety) at one end of the molecule.
2. An adjacent acid proton.
3. A small sized alkyl substituent on the heterocyclic ring.
4. A relatively flat overall topography.
5. An electron rich centre and/or a hydrogen bond acceptor site opposite to the dipole.

== Examples of selective PDE3 inhibitors ==
Theophylline, a non-selective inhibitor

Meribendan, a highly selective inhibitor

CI-930, the parent compound of meribendan

Theophylline is a non-selective agent. In contrast, meribendan is a highly selective inhibitor.

Also, meribendan has a higher level of selectivity in comparison with the parent compound CI-930 because, beside the basic nitrogen adjacent to the lactam moiety it possesses another basic nitrogen (benzimidazole ring), opposite to the primary binding site.

== Research ==
RPL-554 is an analog of trequinsin, and like trequinsin, is a dual inhibitor of the phosphodiesterase enzymes PDE-3 and PDE-4. As of October 2015, inhaled RPL-554 delivered via a nebulizer was in development for COPD and had been studied in asthma.
