= Ensifentrine =

Chemical compound

Clinical data
- Trade names: Ohtuvayre
- Other names: RPL-554, LS-193,855
- AHFS/Drugs.com: Monograph
- MedlinePlus: a624040
- License data: US DailyMed: Ensifentrine
- Routes of administration: Inhalation
- Drug class: PDE3 inhibitor/PDE4 inhibitor
- ATC code: None

Legal status
- Legal status: US: ℞-only

Identifiers
- IUPAC name: N-{2-[(2E)-2-(mesitylimino)-9,10-dimethoxy-4-oxo-6,7-dihydro-2H-pyrimido[6,1-a]-isoquinolin-3(4H)-yl]ethyl}urea
- CAS Number: 298680-25-8; 1884461-72-6
- PubChem CID: 9934746
- DrugBank: DB16157
- ChemSpider: 8110374
- UNII: 3E3D8T1GIX
- KEGG: D11743
- CompTox Dashboard (EPA): DTXSID00183983

Chemical and physical data
- Formula: C_{26}H_{31}N_{5}O_{4}
- Molar mass: 477.565 g·mol^{−1}
- 3D model (JSmol): Interactive image
- SMILES: Cc3cc(C)cc(C)c3N=c2cc1-c(cc4OC)c(cc4OC)CCn1c(=O)n2CCNC(N)=O
- InChI: InChI=1S/C26H31N5O4/c1-15-10-16(2)24(17(3)11-15)29-23-14-20-19-13-22(35-5)21(34-4)12-18(19)6-8-30(20)26(33)31(23)9-7-28-25(27)32/h10-14H,6-9H2,1-5H3,(H3,27,28,32)/b29-23+; Key:CSOBIBXVIYAXFM-BYNJWEBRSA-N

Ensifentrine, sold under the brand name Ohtuvayre, is a medication used for the treatment of chronic obstructive pulmonary disease (COPD) in adults. It is a phosphodiesterase 3 inhibitor and phosphodiesterase 4 inhibitor. It is given by inhalation.

PDE3 inhibitors act as bronchodilators, while PDE4 inhibitors have an anti-inflammatory effect.

Ensifentrine was approved for medical use in the United States in June 2024.

== Medical uses ==
Ensifentrine is indicated for the maintenance treatment of chronic obstructive pulmonary disease in adults.

== Pharmacology ==
It is an analog of trequinsin and, like trequinsin, it is a highly selective inhibitor of the phosphodiesterase enzyme, PDE3; it is >3000-times more potent against PDE3 than PDE4.

== History ==
Ensifentrine was part of a family of compounds invented by Sir David Jack, former head of R&D for GlaxoSmithKline, and Alexander Oxford, a medicinal chemist; the patents on their work were assigned to Vernalis plc.

In 2005, Rhinopharma Ltd, acquired the rights to the intellectual property from Vernalis. Rhinopharma was a startup founded in Vancouver, Canada in 2004 by Michael Walker, Clive Page, and David Saint, to discover and develop drugs for chronic respiratory diseases, and intended to develop ensifentrine, delivered with an inhaler, first for allergic rhinitis, then asthma, then for chronic obstructive pulmonary disease. Ensifentrine was synthesized at a contract research organization, under the supervision of Oxford, and was studied in collaboration with Page's lab at King’s College, London. In 2006 Rhinopharma recapitalized and was renamed Verona Pharma plc.

== Society and culture ==
=== Legal status ===
Ensifentrine was approved for medical use in the United States in June 2024.
