= Blood pressure medicine =

Blood pressure medicine may refer to

- Antihypertensive drug (high blood pressure)
- Antihypotensive agent (low blood pressure)
