= Pimobendan =

Chemical compound

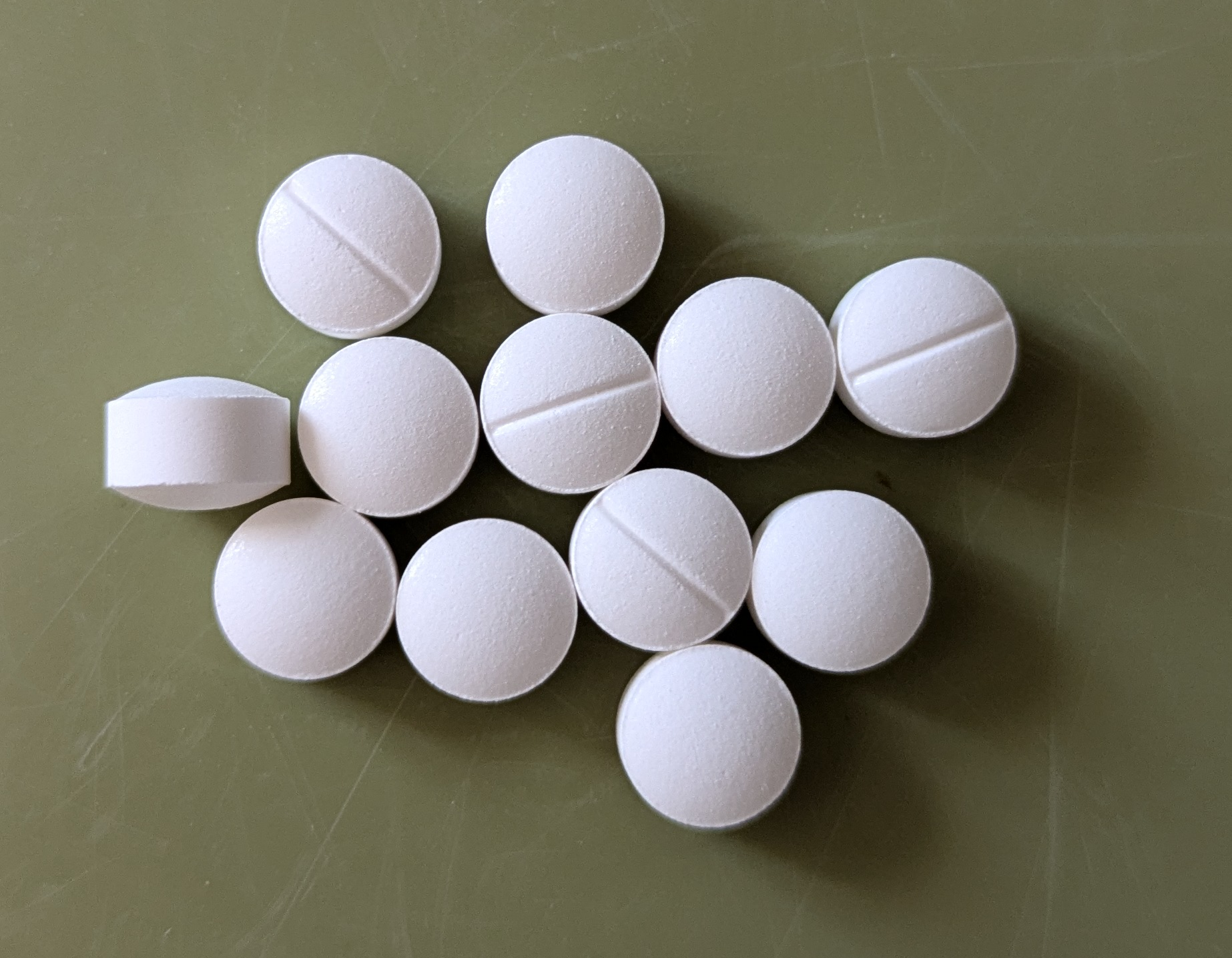

Clinical data
- Trade names: Vetmedin, others
- AHFS/Drugs.com: International Drug Names
- License data: US DailyMed: Pimobendan
- Routes of administration: By mouth
- Drug class: Calcium sensitizer
- ATCvet code: QC01CE90 (WHO)

Legal status
- Legal status: US: ℞-only; In general: ℞ (Prescription only)

Pharmacokinetic data
- Bioavailability: 60 to 65%
- Elimination half-life: 0.4 hours
- Excretion: In feces

Identifiers
- IUPAC name: (RS)-6-[2-(4-Methoxyphenyl)-1H-benzimidazol-5-yl]-5-methyl-4,5-dihydropyridazin-3(2H)-one
- CAS Number: 74150-27-9
- PubChem CID: 4823
- ChemSpider: 4657
- UNII: 34AP3BBP9T
- KEGG: D01133
- ChEMBL: ChEMBL24646
- CompTox Dashboard (EPA): DTXSID8048280
- ECHA InfoCard: 100.168.193

Chemical and physical data
- Formula: C_{19}H_{18}N_{4}O_{2}
- Molar mass: 334.379 g·mol^{−1}
- 3D model (JSmol): Interactive image
- Chirality: Racemic mixture
- SMILES: CC1CC(=O)NN=C1C2=CC3=C(C=C2)N=C(N3)C4=CC=C(C=C4)OC
- InChI: InChI=1S/C19H18N4O2/c1-11-9-17(24)22-23-18(11)13-5-8-15-16(10-13)21-19(20-15)12-3-6-14(25-2)7-4-12/h3-8,10-11H,9H2,1-2H3,(H,20,21)(H,22,24); Key:GLBJJMFZWDBELO-UHFFFAOYSA-N

Pimobendan (INN, or pimobendane), sold under the brand name Vetmedin among others, is a veterinary medication. It is a calcium sensitizer and a selective inhibitor of phosphodiesterase 3 (PDE3) with positive inotropic and vasodilator effects.

Pimobendan is used in the management of heart failure in dogs, most commonly caused by myxomatous mitral valve disease (also previously known as endocardiosis), or dilated cardiomyopathy. Research has shown that as a monotherapy, pimobendan increases survival time and improves quality of life in canine patients with congestive heart failure secondary to mitral valve disease when compared with benazepril, an ACE inhibitor. Under the brand name Acardi, it is available for human use in Japan. It is available as a generic medication.

== Medical uses ==
Pimobendan is indicated for the management of the signs of mild, moderate, or severe congestive heart failure in dogs due to clinical myxomatous mitral valve disease (MMVD) or dilated cardiomyopathy (DCM); and for use with concurrent therapy for congestive heart failure (e.g., furosemide, etc.) as appropriate on a case-by-case basis. It is also indicated for the delay of onset of congestive heart failure in dogs with Stage B2 preclinical myxomatous mitral valve disease.

== Mechanism of action ==
Pimobendan is a positive inotrope, and its main function is to increase myocardial contractility. It sensitizes and increases the binding efficiency of cardiac troponin in the myofibril to the calcium ions that are already present in systole. In healthy hearts, it elevates oxygen and energy consumption to a level comparable to that achieved with dobutamine; however, in pathological hearts, this effect may not occur. Pimobendan also causes peripheral vasodilation by inhibiting the function of phosphodiesterase 3 (PDE3). This results in decreased resistance to blood flow through systemic arterioles, which decreases afterload (decreases the failing heart's workload) and reduces the amount of mitral regurgitation.

== Pharmacokinetics ==
Pimobendan is absorbed rapidly when given via the oral route and has a bioavailability of 60–65%. Food decreases the bioavailability of the aqueous solution although the effect on the tablet form is unknown. It is metabolized into an active metabolite (desmethylpimobendan) by the liver. The parent compound, pimobendan, is a potent calcium sensitizer while desmethylpimobendan is a more potent phosphodiesterase III inhibitor. The half-life of pimobendan in the blood is 0.4 hours, and the half-life of its metabolite is two hours. Elimination is by excretion in the bile and then feces. Pimobendan is 90–95% bound to plasma proteins in circulation. This may have implications in patients with low blood protein levels (hypoproteinemia/hypoalbuminemia) and in patients that are on concurrent therapies that are also highly protein bound.

== Combinations ==
Pimobendan is often used in combination with three other drugs to palliate dogs with heart failure (pulmonary edema, pleural effusion, ascites). These are:

- Furosemide, a diuretic, to reduce edema and effusion.
- Spironolactone, an aldosterone antagonist. This has two actions, firstly, as a potassium-sparing diuretic, although its diuretic properties are small compared with those of furosemide. Secondly, it reduces aldosterone-mediated myocardial fibrosis, possibly slowing the progression of heart disease.
- An ACE inhibitor, often enalapril (brand name Enacard) or benazepril (Fortekor). These drugs inhibit the action of angiotensin-converting enzyme, producing a balanced vasodilation, along with other potentially favorable effects.

== Synthesis ==
Thieme Patents:

The reaction between p-anisoyl chloride [100-07-2] (1) and CID:20516917 (2) gives 4-[4-[(4-Methoxybenzoyl)amino]-3-nitrophenyl]-3-methyl-4-oxobutanoic acid, CID:20516902 (3). The reaction of this with hydrazine gives 5-methyl-6-[3-nitro-4-(4-methoxy-benzoylamino)-phenyl]-3-oxo-4,5-dihydro-2H-pyridazine [74149-73-8]. Catalytic hydrogenation reduces the nitro group giving [74149-74-9] (4). cyclization of the resulting ortho amino amide by means of a strong acid leads to the formation of the corresponding benzimidazole. There is thus obtained pimobendan (5).
