= C22H32N2O2 =

The molecular formula C_{22}H_{32}N_{2}O_{2} (molar mass: 356.50 g/mol, exact mass: 356.2464 u) may refer to:

- Dopexamine
- U-69,593
