= Dopexamine =

Chemical compound

Clinical data
- AHFS/Drugs.com: International Drug Names
- ATC code: C01CA14 (WHO)

Identifiers
- IUPAC name: 4-[2-({6-[(2-phenylethyl)amino]hexyl}amino)ethyl]benzene-1,2-diol
- CAS Number: 86197-47-9
- PubChem CID: 55483
- ChemSpider: 50102
- UNII: 398E7Z7JB5
- KEGG: D03891
- ChEMBL: ChEMBL77622
- CompTox Dashboard (EPA): DTXSID2048666

Chemical and physical data
- Formula: C_{22}H_{32}N_{2}O_{2}
- Molar mass: 356.510 g·mol^{−1}
- 3D model (JSmol): Interactive image
- SMILES: Oc1ccc(cc1O)CCNCCCCCCNCCc2ccccc2
- InChI: InChI=1S/C22H32N2O2/c25-21-11-10-20(18-22(21)26)13-17-24-15-7-2-1-6-14-23-16-12-19-8-4-3-5-9-19/h3-5,8-11,18,23-26H,1-2,6-7,12-17H2; Key:RYBJORHCUPVNMB-UHFFFAOYSA-N

Dopexamine is a synthetic analogue of dopamine that is administered intravenously in hospitals to reduce exacerbations of heart failure and to treat heart failure following cardiac surgery. It is not used often, as more established drugs like epinephrine, dopamine, dobutamine, norepinephrine, and levosimendan work as well. It works by stimulating beta-2 adrenergic receptors and peripheral dopamine receptor D1 and dopamine receptor D2. It also inhibits the neuronal re-uptake of norepinephrine.

The most common adverse effects include fast heart beats and nausea.

It was discovered by scientists at Fisons, which licensed it to Ipsen in 1993, and Ipsen in turn licensed it to Élan in 1999. Ipsen licensed rights in North America and Japan to Circassia in 2008; the drug had never been approved in those countries. Dopexamine went off-patent in 2010.

== Medical use ==
Dopexamine is used in hospitals as an inotropic agent to reduce exacerbations of heart failure and to treat heart failure following cardiac surgery. It is administered intravenuously.

As of 2010 dopexamine was not often administered in cardiac care because other, more well established drugs can accomplish the same effect, other such drugs include epinephrine, dopamine, dobutamine, norepinephrine, and levosimendan.

It should not be used in people taking monoamine oxidase inhibitors, nor in people who have certain adrenal cancers, low platelet counts, or people with left ventricular outlet obstruction.

It also should not be used in people with severe low blood pressure or reduced systemic vascular resistance. It should be used in caution in people with ischemic heart disease especially following heart attack or a recent episode of angina due to the risk of tachycardia. It should not be used in people with reduced blood volume.

Safety in pregnant women has not been established.

== Adverse effects ==
Very common (greater than 10%) adverse effects include fast heart beats and nausea. Common (between 1% and 10%) adverse effects include tremor, headache, transient low blood pressure, vomiting, increased sweating, sepsis, sinus and nodal slow heart beat, cardiac arrest, myocardial infarction, cardiac enzyme changes, non-specific ECG changes, high blood pressure, hemorrhage, respiratory failure, acute respiratory distress syndrome, pulmonary edema, pulmonary hypertension, and kidney failure.

Like other β2-agonists, dopexamine lowers potassium levels and raises glucose levels, so there is a risk of exacerbating hypokalaemia or hyperglycaemia.

People can develop drug tolerance to dopexamine if it is administered over a long period of time, as with other catecholamines.

Dopexamine may potentiate the effects of other catecholamines like noradrenaline. Effects of depexamine may be suppressed by concomitant use with β2-adrenergic and dopamine receptor antagonists requires caution.

== Pharmacology ==
The half-life of IV dopexamine is 6–7 minutes in healthy adults and 11 minutes in patients with heart failure.

=== Mechanism of action ===
Dopexamine stimulates beta-2 adrenergic receptors and peripheral dopamine receptor D1 and dopamine receptor D2. It also inhibits of neuronal re-uptake of norepinephrine (Uptake-1). These activities increase cardiac output and increase blood flow to peripheral vascular beds. It is not an α-adrenergic agonist, does not cause vasoconstriction, and is not a pressor agent.

As of 2004 there was some controversy surrounding the mechanism of dopexamine. Some held that its local effects of increased tissue perfusion were due only to increased output from the heart, while others held that were direct peripheral effects.

== Chemistry ==
Dopexamine is a synthetic analogue of dopamine, a catecholamine. Its formula may be stated 4-[2-[4[[6-[(2-phenylethy)amino]-hexyl]amino]ethyl]-1,2-benzenediol or 4-[2-[4[[6-(phenethylamino)hexyl]-amino]ethyl]pyrocatechol.

Chinese manufacturers dominated the market for the active pharmaceutical ingredient as of 2015.

== History ==
Dopexamine was discovered by scientists at Fisons and Fisons received the USAN name dopexamine in 1985 for its compound, then called FPL 60278.

The drug was marketed by 1992 and by 1996 had been approved in several countries.

Fisons licensed the rights to Ipsen in 1993, and Ipsen in turn licensed the rights to Elan in 1999.

The patent on dopexamine was controlled by Elan when it expired in 2003.

Dopexamine was approved for use in the European Union for treatment of symptoms related to heart failure in 2010.

In 2008 the UK company Circassia acquired the US, Canadian, and Japanese marketing rights to dopexamine from Ipsen; at the time, the company said it was planning to develop a new formulation of dopexamine in combination with fluids delivered via IV fluids, looking to improve outcomes following surgery. As of 2008 dopexamine had not been approved for any use in the US, Canada, or Japan. A

Teva recalled batches of dopexamine in the UK in 2014 due to quality control issues by the manufacturer, Cephalon.

== Research ==
Use in sepsis has been explored in clinical trials, but use of an inotropic agent like dobutamine or dopexamine did not reduce mortality compared with norepinephrine or epinephrine. Use of dopexamine may be harmful in sepsis
