= Decompensation =

Medical condition

In medicine, decompensation is the functional deterioration of a structure or system that had been previously working with the help of compensation. Decompensation may occur due to fatigue, stress, illness, or old age. When a system is "compensated", it is able to function despite stressors or defects. Decompensation describes an inability to compensate for these deficiencies. It is a general term commonly used in medicine to describe a variety of situations.

== Medical term ==
For example, cardiac decompensation may refer to the failure of the heart to maintain adequate blood circulation, after long-standing (previously compensated) vascular disease (see heart failure). Short-term treatment of cardiac decompensation can be achieved through administration of dobutamine, resulting in an increase in heart contractility via an inotropic effect.

Kidney failure can also occur following a slow degradation of kidney function due to an underlying untreated illness; the symptoms of the latter can then become much more severe due to the lack of efficient compensation by the kidney.

Some of the signs of chronic liver disease detectable on clinical examination are associated with decompensation.

== Psychology ==
In psychology, the term refers to an individual's loss of healthy defense mechanisms in response to stress, resulting in personality disturbance or psychological imbalance.
