= Beta-1 adrenergic receptor =

Protein-coding gene in the species Homo sapiens

ADRB1

Identifiers
- Aliases: ADRB1, ADRB1R, B1AR, BETA1AR, RHR, adrenoceptor beta 1, FNSS2
- External IDs: OMIM: 109630; MGI: 87937; GeneCards: ADRB1
Available structures
PDB	Ortholog search: PDBe RCSB
PDB	List of PDB id codes 2LSQ

Gene location (Human)
Chr.	Chromosome 10 (human)
Band	10q25.3	Start	114,043,866 bp
Band	10q25.3	End	114,046,904 bp

Gene location (Mouse)
Chr.	Chromosome 19 (mouse)
Band	19 D2|19 51.96 cM	Start	56,710,631 bp
Band	19 D2|19 51.96 cM	End	56,721,545 bp
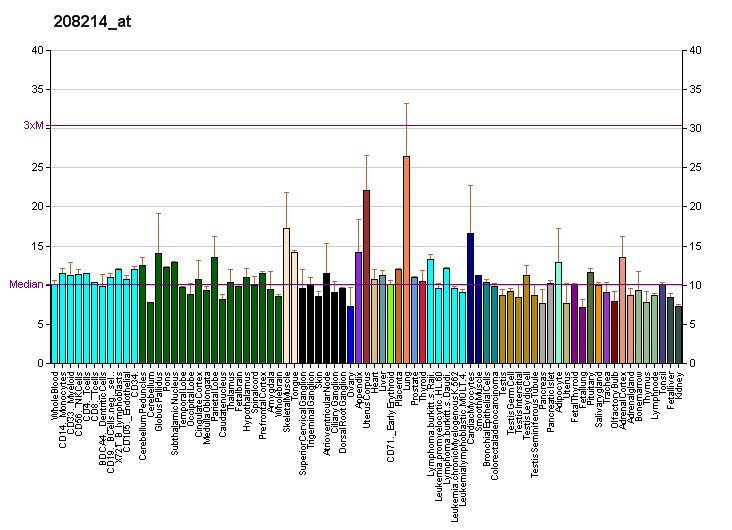
RNA expression pattern
Bgee	Human / Mouse (ortholog); Top expressed in: right ventricle; parotid gland; bronchial epithelial cell; lower lobe of lung; endothelial cell; placenta; Brodmann area 23; apex of heart; postcentral gyrus; buccal mucosa cell / Top expressed in: parotid gland; pineal gland; right lung; right lung lobe; submandibular gland; left lung; primary motor cortex; prefrontal cortex; nucleus accumbens; conjunctival fornix; More reference expression data
BioGPS	More reference expression data
Gene ontology
Molecular function	beta-adrenergic receptor activity; PDZ domain binding; G protein-coupled receptor activity; epinephrine binding; norepinephrine binding; signal transducer activity; adrenergic receptor activity; protein binding; alpha-2A adrenergic receptor binding; protein heterodimerization activity; beta1-adrenergic receptor activity; G protein-coupled neurotransmitter receptor activity involved in regulation of postsynaptic membrane potential
Cellular component	integral component of membrane; endosome; membrane; plasma membrane; integral component of plasma membrane; early endosome; Schaffer collateral - CA1 synapse; integral component of postsynaptic density membrane
Biological process	fear response; adenylate cyclase-activating G protein-coupled receptor signaling pathway; negative regulation of multicellular organism growth; cell-cell signaling; positive regulation of cAMP-mediated signaling; positive regulation of heart rate by epinephrine-norepinephrine; activation of adenylate cyclase activity; norepinephrine-epinephrine-mediated vasodilation involved in regulation of systemic arterial blood pressure; diet induced thermogenesis; adenylate cyclase-activating adrenergic receptor signaling pathway; positive regulation of heart contraction; positive regulation of GTPase activity; positive regulation of the force of heart contraction by epinephrine-norepinephrine; heat generation; brown fat cell differentiation; response to cold; temperature homeostasis; signal transduction; G protein-coupled receptor signaling pathway; adenylate cyclase-modulating G protein-coupled receptor signaling pathway; regulation of postsynaptic membrane potential; positive regulation of cold-induced thermogenesis
Sources:Amigo / QuickGO
Orthologs
Databases	NCBI: entry; OMA: entry
Species	Human	Mouse
Entrez	153	11554
Ensembl	ENSG00000043591	ENSMUSG00000035283
UniProt	P08588	P34971
RefSeq (mRNA)	NM_000684	NM_007419
RefSeq (protein)	NP_000675	NP_031445
Location (UCSC)	Chr 10: 114.04 – 114.05 Mb	Chr 19: 56.71 – 56.72 Mb
PubMed search
- Wikidata
View/Edit Human	View/Edit Mouse

The beta-1 adrenergic receptor (β_{1} adrenoceptor), also known as ADRB1, can refer to either the protein-encoding gene (gene ADRB1) or one of the four adrenergic receptors. It is a G-protein coupled receptor associated with the Gs heterotrimeric G-protein that is expressed predominantly in cardiac tissue. In addition to cardiac tissue, beta-1 adrenergic receptors are also expressed in the cerebral cortex.

== Historical context ==
W. B. Cannon postulated that there were two chemical transmitters or sympathins while studying the sympathetic nervous system in 1933. These E and I sympathins were involved with excitatory and inhibitory responses. In 1948, Raymond Ahlquist published a manuscript in the American Journal of Physiology establishing the idea of adrenaline having distinct actions on both alpha and beta receptors. Shortly afterward, Eli Lilly Laboratories synthesized the first beta-blocker, dichloroisoproterenol.

== General information ==
=== Structure ===
ADRB-1 is a transmembrane protein that belongs to the G-Protein-Coupled Receptor (GPCR) family. GPCRs play a key role in cell signaling pathways and are primarily known for their seven transmembrane (7TM) helices, which have a cylindrical structure and span the membrane. The 7TM domains have three intracellular and three extracellular loops that connect these domains to one another. The extracellular loops contain sites for ligand binding on N-terminus of the receptor and the intracellular loops and C-terminus interact with signaling proteins, such as G-proteins. The extracellular loops also contain several sites for post-translational modification and are involved in ligand binding. The third intracellular loop is the largest and contains phosphorylation sites for signaling regulation. As the name suggests, GPCRs are coupled to G-proteins that are heterotrimeric in nature. Heterotrimeric G-proteins consist of three subunits: alpha, beta, and gamma. Upon the binding of a ligand to the extracellular domain of the GPCR, a conformational change is induced in the receptor that allows it to interact with the alpha-subunit of the G-protein. Following this interaction, the G-alpha subunit exchanges GDP for GTP, becomes active, and dissociates from the beta and gamma subunits. The free alpha subunit is then able to activate downstream signaling pathways (detail more in interactions and pathway).

=== Function ===
==== Pathways ====
ADRB-1 is activated by the catecholamines adrenaline and noradrenaline. Once these ligands bind, the ADRB-1 receptor activates several different signaling pathways and interactions. Some of the most well-known pathways are:

1. Adenylyl cyclase: When a ligand binds to the ADRB-1 receptor, the alpha-subunit of the heterotrimeric G-protein gets activated, which in turn, activates the enzyme adenylyl cyclase. Adenylyl cyclase then catalyzes the conversion of ATP to cyclic AMP (cAMP), which activates downstream effectors such as Protein Kinase A (PKA).
2. cAMP activation of PKA: cAMP generated by adenylyl cyclase activates PKA, which then phosphorylates numerous downstream targets such as ion channels, other enzymes, and transcription factors .
3. Beta-arrestins: Activation of the ADRB-1 receptor can lead to the recruitment of Beta-arrestins, which are used to activate signaling pathways independent of G-proteins. An example of an independent pathway is the MAPK (mitogen-activated protein kinase) pathways.
4. Calcium signaling: ADRB-1 signaling also activates the Gq/11 family of G proteins, which is a subfamily of heterotrimeric G proteins that activates phospholipase C (PLC). PLC cleaves phosphatidylinositol 4,5-bisphosphate (PIP_{2}) into the second messengers inositol 1,4,5-triphosphate (IP_{3}) and diacylglycerol (DAG). IP_{3} binds to IP_{3} receptors on the endoplasmic reticulum, which then leads to the release of calcium ions (Ca2+) into the cytoplasm, resulting in the activation of downstream signaling pathways.

==== Summary of interactions ====
Actions of the β_{1} receptor include:

System	Effect	Tissue
Muscular	Increases cardiac output	Cardiac muscle
Muscular	Increases heart rate (chronotropic effect)	Sinoatrial node (SA node)
Muscular	Increases atrial contractility (inotropic effect)	Cardiac muscle
Muscular	Increases contractility and automaticity	Ventricular cardiac muscle
Muscular	Increases conduction and automaticity	Atrioventricular node (AV node)
Muscular	Relaxation	Urinary bladder wall
Exocrine	Releases renin	Juxtaglomerular cells.
Exocrine	Stimulates viscous, amylase-filled secretions	Salivary glands
Other	Lipolysis	Adipose tissue

The receptor is also present in the cerebral cortex.

Other pathways that the ADRB-1 receptor plays an important role in:

1. Regulation of peripheral clock and central circadian clock synchronization: The suprachiasmatic nucleus (SCN) receives light information from the eyes and synchronizes the peripheral clocks to the central circadian clock through the release of different neuropeptides and hormones. ADRB-1 receptors can play a role in modulating the release of neuropeptides like vasoactive intestinal peptide (VIP) and arginine vasopressin (AVP) from the SCN, which can then synchronize peripheral clocks.
2. Regulation of glucose metabolism: The regulation of glucose metabolism is known to be linked with ADRB-1 receptor signaling. The signal transduction pathway that is activated through the ADRB-1 receptor can regulate the expression of clock genes and glucose transporters. The disregulation of ADRB-1 receptor signaling has been implicated in metabolic disorders such as diabetes and obesity.
3. ADRB-1 receptor and rhythmic control of immunity: Circadian oscillations in catecholamine signals influence various cellular targets which express adrenergic receptors, including immune cells. The adrenergic system regulates a range of physiological functions which are carried out through catecholamine production. Humans are found to have low circulating catecholamine levels during the night and high levels during the day, while rodents exhibit the opposite pattern. Studies demonstrating the patterns of norepinephrine levels indicate that there is no circadian rhythmicity. Circulating rhythms in epinephrine, however, appear to be circadian and are regulated by the HPA axis:
  1. Cyclic variation in HPA signals are likely important in driving diurnal oscillations in adrenaline.
  2. The most well-characterized means through which adrenergic signals exert circadian control over immunity is by cell-trafficking regulation. Variation in the number of white blood cells seemed to be linked to adrenergic function.
4. Cardiac rhythm and cardiac failure: The β-AR signaling pathway serves as a primary component of the interface between the sympathetic nervous system and the cardiovascular system. The β-AR pathway dysregulation has been implicated in the pathogenesis of heart failure. It has been found that certain changes to β-AR signaling result in reduced levels of β1-AR, by up to 50%, while levels of β2-AR remain constant. Other intracellular changes include a significant, sharp increase of GαI levels, and increased βARK1 activity. These changes suggest sharp decreases in β-AR signaling, likely due to sustained, elevated levels of catecholamines.

==== Mechanism in cardiac myocytes ====
G_{s} exerts its effects via two pathways. Firstly, it directly opens L-type calcium channels (LTCC) in the plasma membrane. Secondly, it renders adenylate cyclase activated, resulting in an increase of cAMP, activating protein kinase A (PKA) which in turn phosphorylates several targets, such as phospholamban, LTCC, Troponin I (TnI), and potassium channels. The phosphorylation of phospholamban deactivates its own function which normally inhibits SERCA on the sarcoplasmic reticulum (SR) in cardiac myocytes. Due to this, more calcium enters the SR and is therefore available for the next contraction. LTCC phosphorylation increases its open probability and therefore allows more calcium to enter the myocyte upon cell depolarisation. Both of these mechanisms increase the available calcium for contraction and therefore increase inotropy. Conversely, TnI phosphorylation results in its facilitated dissociation of calcium from troponin C (TnC) which speeds the muscle relaxation (positive lusitropy). Potassium channel phosphorylation increases its open probability which results in shorter refractory period (because the cell repolarises faster), also increasing lusitropy. Furthermore, in nodal cells such as in the SA node, cAMP directly binds to and opens the HCN channels, increasing their open probability, which increases chronotropy.

== Clinical significance ==
=== Familial natural short sleep (FNSS) ===
A missense variant in the ADRB-1 coding sequence was initially identified as causing familial natural short sleep in one affected family. However, subsequent biobank research showed that other carriers of this mutation or of different high-impact mutations in the same gene did not exhibit any change in sleep duration, indicating that the cause of the short sleeper phenotype in this family had a different basis.

=== Polymorphisms ===
One of the single nucleotide polymorphisms (SNPs) in ADRB-1 is the change from a cytosine to a guanine, resulting in a protein switch from arginine (389R) to glycine (389G) at the 389 codon position. Arginine at codon 389 is highly preserved across species and this mutation happens in the G-protein binding domain of ADRB-1, one of the key functions of ADRB-1 protein, so it is likely to lead to functional differences. In fact, this SNP causes dampened efficiency and affinity in agonist-promoted receptor binding.

Another common SNP occurs at codon position 49, with a change of serine (49S) to glycine (49G) in the N-terminus sequence of ADRB-1. The 49S variant is shown to be more resistant to agonist-promoted down regulation and short intervals of agonist exposure. The receptor of the 49G variant is always expressed, which results in high coupling activity with adenylyl cyclase and increased sensitivity to agonists.

Both of these SNPs have relatively high frequencies among populations and are thought to affect cardiac functions. Individuals who are homozygous for the 389R allele are more likely to have higher blood pressure and heart rates than others who have either one or two copies of the 389G allele. Additionally, patients with heart diseases that have a substitution of glycine for serine at codon 49 (49S > G) show improved cardiac functions and decreased mortality rate. The cardiovascular responses induced by this polymorphism in the healthy population are also examined. Healthy individuals with a glycine at codon 49 show better cardiovascular functions at rest and response to maximum heart rate during exercise, evident for the cardioprotection related to this polymorphism.

=== Pharmaceutical interventions ===
Because ADRB-1 plays such a critical role in maintaining blood pressure homeostasis and cardiac output, many medications treat these conditions by either potentiating or inhibiting the functions of the ADRB-1. Dobutamine is one of the adrenergic drugs and agonists that selectively bind to ADRB-1 and is often used in treatments of cardiogenic shock and heart failure. It is also important to note the use of illicit drug for ADRB-1 since cocaine, beta-blocking agents, or other sympathetic stimulators may cause a medical emergency.

== Ligands ==
=== Agonists ===
ADRB-1 agonists mimic or initiate a physiological response when bound to a receptor. Isoprenaline has higher affinity for β_{1} than adrenaline, which, in turn, binds with higher affinity than noradrenaline at physiologic concentrations. As ADRB-1 increases cardiac output, selective agonists clinically function as potential treatments for heart failure. Selective agonists to the beta-1 receptor are:

- Denopamine is used in the treatment of angina and has potential uses to treat congestive heart failure and pulmonary oedema.
- Dobutamine (in cardiogenic shock) is a beta-1 agonist that treats cardiac decompensation.
- Xamoterol (cardiac stimulant) acts as a partial agonist that improves heart function in studies with cardiac failure. Xamoterol plays a role in modulating the sympathetic nervous system, but does not have any agonistic action on beta-2 adrenergic receptors.
- Isoproterenol is a nonselective agonist that potentiates the effects of agents like adrenaline and norepinephrine to increase heart contractility.

=== Antagonists ===
ADRB-1 antagonists are a class of drugs also referred to as Beta Blockers β1-selective antagonists are used to manage abnormal heart rhythms and block the action of substances like adrenaline on neurons, allowing blood to flow more easily which lowers blood pressure and cardiac output. They may also shrink vascular tumors. Some examples of Beta-Blockers include:

- Acebutolol (in hypertension, angina pectoris and arrhythmias)
- Atenolol (in hypertension, coronary heart disease, arrhythmias and myocardial infarction)
- Betaxolol (in hypertension and glaucoma)
- Bisoprolol (in hypertension, coronary heart disease, arrhythmias, myocardial infarction and ischemic heart diseases)
- Esmolol (in arrhythmias)
- Metoprolol (in coronary heart disease, myocardial infarction and heart failure)
- Nebivolol (in hypertension)
- Vortioxetine (antidepressant)

== See also ==
- Other adrenergic receptors
  - Alpha-1 adrenergic receptor
  - Alpha-2 adrenergic receptor
  - Beta-2 adrenergic receptor
  - Beta-3 adrenergic receptor
