= S-Ethylisothiouronium diethylphosphate =

Chemical compound

Clinical data
- Trade names: Difetur

Identifiers
- IUPAC name: S-Ethylisothiouronium diethylphosphate
- CAS Number: 21704-46-1
- PubChem CID: 11847634
- ChemSpider: 182755
- UNII: CTD25O6OBI
- CompTox Dashboard (EPA): DTXSID60176093

Chemical and physical data
- Formula: C_{7}H_{19}N_{2}O_{4}PS
- Molar mass: 258.27 g·mol^{−1}
- 3D model (JSmol): Interactive image
- SMILES: O=P(OCC)(O)OCC.[N@H]=C(SCC)N
- InChI: InChI=1S/C4H11O4P.C3H8N2S/c1-3-7-9(5,6)8-4-2;1-2-6-3(4)5/h3-4H2,1-2H3,(H,5,6);2H2,1H3,(H3,4,5); Key:CSYSULGPHGCBQD-UHFFFAOYSA-N

S-Ethylisothiouronium diethylphosphate (brand name Difetur) is an S-alkylisothiouronium derivative used as an antihypotensive drug. The S-alkylisothiouronium compounds are used in processes of treating acute hypotension, which may result, for example, from shock or hemorrhage, and in processes for treating hyperoxic conditions, for example, oxygen poisoning.

== Indications ==
It is used for increasing arterial blood pressure in cases of acute arterial hypotension due to surgical interference, trauma, poisoning, shock condition, hemorrhages; in conjunction with epidural anesthesia; in overdose of ganglion blockers, alpha-adrenergic blockers, neuroleptics, anesthetics; and in other conditions when adrenomimetics are contra-indicated or ineffective. Difetur was also found to possess oxygen protective activity and, thus, can be used as a medicament for protecting against oxygen poisoning conditions caused by hyperoxia.

S-Ethylisothiouronium diethylphosphate is also used for the treatment of headaches, in particular, migraines, as well as for the prevention or treatment of nausea and vomiting, effective in preventing or alleviating emesis associated with migraines or other medical conditions such as chemotherapy or radiotherapy, as well as other symptoms of migraines including phonophobia and photophobia.

== Mechanism of action ==
S-Ethylisothiouronium diethylphosphate is a specific inhibitor of inducible NO synthase on hepatic NO production level. S-Ethylisothiouronium diethylphosphate affects systemic hemodynamic indices in the following way: the peripheral vascular resistance increases, the stroke volume and central blood volume increase, and the work of the left ventricle improves. Other effects are: analgesic, uterotonic, decongestive and anti-inflammatory.

In difetur’s antihypotensive effect unlike sympathomimetics there is no stimulation of the sympathetic system, thus does not cause tachycardia, nor alter the acid-base balance and electrolyte and does not cause hypotension secondary. These drugs have also sedative action, reduce body temperature and oxygen consumption.

== Forms ==
Injectable solution 10%-1 ml in ampules N 10.
