= Omecamtiv mecarbil =

Chemical compound

Clinical data
- Other names: CK-1827452
- Drug class: Calcium sensitizer; Myosin activator
- ATC code: C01CX10 (WHO)

Identifiers
- IUPAC name: Methyl 4-[(2-fluoro-3-{[N-(6-methylpyridin-3-yl)carbamoyl]amino}phenyl)methyl]piperazine-1-carboxylate
- CAS Number: 873697-71-3
- PubChem CID: 11689883
- DrugBank: DB11816
- ChemSpider: 9864610
- UNII: 2M19539ERK
- KEGG: D09648
- ChEMBL: ChEMBL1800955
- PDB ligand: 2OW (PDBe, RCSB PDB)
- CompTox Dashboard (EPA): DTXSID901025949

Chemical and physical data
- Formula: C_{20}H_{24}FN_{5}O_{3}
- Molar mass: 401.442 g·mol^{−1}
- 3D model (JSmol): Interactive image
- SMILES: O=C(Nc1ccc(nc1)C)Nc2c(F)c(ccc2)CN3CCN(C(=O)OC)CC3
- InChI: InChI=1S/C20H24FN5O3/c1-14-6-7-16(12-22-14)23-19(27)24-17-5-3-4-15(18(17)21)13-25-8-10-26(11-9-25)20(28)29-2/h3-7,12H,8-11,13H2,1-2H3,(H2,23,24,27); Key:RFUBTTPMWSKEIW-UHFFFAOYSA-N

Omecamtiv mecarbil (INN), previously referred to as CK-1827452, is a calcium sensitizer acting as a cardiac myosin activator. It is an experimental drug being studied for a potential role in the treatment of left ventricular systolic heart failure.

Systolic heart failure involves a loss of effective actin-myosin cross bridges in the myocytes (heart muscle cells) of the left ventricle, which leads to a decreased ability of the heart to move blood through the body. This causes peripheral edema (blood pooling), which the sympathetic nervous system tries to correct by overstimulating the cardiac myocytes, leading to left ventricular hypertrophy, another characteristic of chronic heart failure.

Inotropic therapies work by increasing the force of cardiac contraction, such as through calcium conduction or modulating adrenoreceptors. But these are limited by adverse events, including arrhythmias related to increased myocardial oxygen consumption, desensitization of adrenergic receptors, and altering intracellular calcium levels. Inotropes are also thought to be associated with worse prognosis.

== Mechanism of action ==
Cardiac myocytes contract through a cross-bridge cycle between the myofilaments, actin and myosin. Chemical energy in the form of ATP is converted into mechanical energy which allows myosin to strongly bind to actin and produce a power stroke resulting in sarcomere shortening/contraction. Omecamtiv mecarbil specifically targets and activates myocardial ATPase and improves energy utilization. This enhances effective myosin cross-bridge formation and duration, while the velocity of contraction remains the same. Specifically, it increases the rate of phosphate release from myosin by stabilizing the pre-powerstroke and the phosphate release states, thereby accelerating the rate-determining step of the cross-bridge cycle, which is the transition of the actin-myosin complex from the weakly bound to the strongly bound state. Furthermore, once myosin is bound to actin, it stays bound dramatically longer in the presence of omecamtiv mecarbil. The combination of increased and prolonged cross-bridge formation prolongs myocardial contraction. Thus, the overall clinical result of omecamtiv mecarbil is an increase in left ventricular systolic ejection time and ejection fraction.

There is a slight decrease in heart rate while myocardial oxygen consumption is unaffected. The increased cardiac output is independent of intracellular calcium and cAMP levels. Thus omecamtiv mecarbil improves systolic function by increasing the systolic ejection duration and stroke volume, without consuming more ATP energy, oxygen or altering intracellular calcium levels causing an overall improvement in cardiac efficiency.

== Clinical trials ==
Experimental studies on rats and dogs, proved the efficacy and mechanism of action of omecamtiv mecarbil. Clinical studies on humans have shown there is a direct linear relationship between dose and systolic ejection time. The dose-dependent effects persisted throughout the entire trial, suggesting that desensitization does not occur. The maximum tolerated dose was observed to be an infusion of 0.5 mg/kg/h. Adverse effects, such as ischemia, were only seen at doses beyond this level, due to extreme lengthening of systolic ejection time.

Omecamtiv mecarbil effectively relieves symptoms and enhances the quality of life of systolic heart failure patients. It improved cardiac performance in short-term studies; however, while the drug reduced the risk of hospitalization or other urgent care for heart failure by 8% in high-risk patients in the Phase III clinical trial GALACTIC-HF, patients receiving the drug did not live any longer. The drug also did not improve exercise intolerance in heart failure patients in the Phase III METEORIC trial. The METEORIC-HF randomized clinical trial found that omecamtiv mecarbil does not significantly improve exercise capacity.

== Myosin inhibition ==
Research groups found that omecamtiv mecarbil actually inhibits myosin by enhancing the duty ratio, increasing calcium sensitivity and slowing force development. It may still activate muscle as a whole however despite suppressing the working stroke of myosin.

== History ==
The US Food and Drug Administration (FDA) granted, in May 2020, a fast-track designation for omecamtiv mecarbil.
