= Olprinone =

Chemical compound

Clinical data
- Routes of administration: IV

Legal status
- Legal status: Rx-only (JP). Not marketed in US and the EU

Identifiers
- IUPAC name: 5-imidazo[1,2-a]pyridin-6-yl-6-methyl-2-oxo-1H-pyridine-3-carbonitrile
- CAS Number: 106730-54-5
- PubChem CID: 4593
- ChemSpider: 4432
- UNII: 4Y8BMI9YGC
- CompTox Dashboard (EPA): DTXSID1048461

Chemical and physical data
- Formula: C_{14}H_{10}N_{4}O
- Molar mass: 250.261 g·mol^{−1}
- 3D model (JSmol): Interactive image
- SMILES: Cc1[nH]c(=O)c(C#N)cc1-c1ccc2nccn2c1
- InChI: InChI=1S/C14H10N4O/c1-9-12(6-11(7-15)14(19)17-9)10-2-3-13-16-4-5-18(13)8-10/h2-6,8H,1H3,(H,17,19); Key:JPAWFIIYTJQOKW-UHFFFAOYSA-N

Olprinone (INN) is a cardiotonic agent. It has been marketed in Japan since 1996.
