= CGMP =

CGMP is an initialism. It can refer to:

- cyclic guanosine monophosphate (cGMP)
- current good manufacturing practice (cGMP)
- CGMP, Cisco Group Management Protocol, the Cisco version of Internet Group Management Protocol snooping
- caseinoglycomacropeptide (CGMP) or caseinomacropeptide; see K-casein
- Competitive guaranteed maximum price
