= Phosphodiesterase 3 =

Class of enzymes

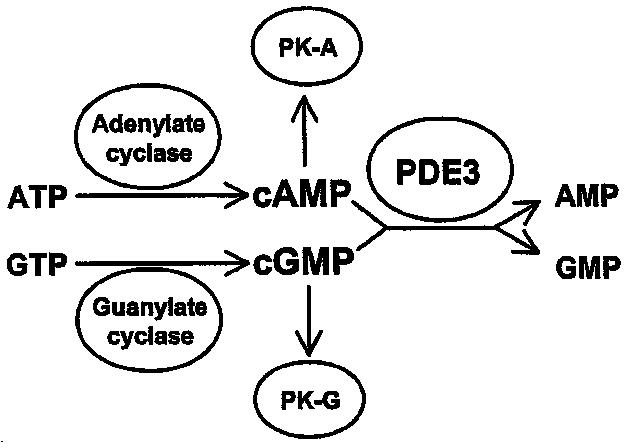
Figure 1: Role of PDE3 in cAMP- and cGMP-mediated signal transduction. PK-A: Protein kinase A (cAMP dependent). PK-G: Protein kinase G (cGMP-dependent).

PDE3 is a phosphodiesterase. The PDEs belong to at least eleven related gene families, which are different in their primary structure, substrate affinity, responses to effectors, and regulation mechanism. Most of the PDE families are composed of more than one gene. PDE3 is clinically significant because of its role in regulating heart muscle, vascular smooth muscle and platelet aggregation. PDE3 inhibitors have been developed as pharmaceuticals, but their use is limited by arrhythmic effects and they can increase mortality in some applications.

== Function ==
PDE3 enzymes are involved in regulation of cardiac and vascular smooth muscle contractility. Molecules that inhibit PDE3 were originally investigated for the treatment of heart failure, but, because of unwanted arrhythmic side-effects, they are not studied for that indication any longer. Nonetheless, the PDE3 inhibitor milrinone is approved for use in heart failure in intravenous form.

Both PDE3A and PDE3B are expressed in vascular smooth muscle cells and are likely to modulate contraction. Their expression in vascular smooth muscle is altered under specific conditions such as elevated cAMP and hypoxia.

== Isoforms and genes ==
phosphodiesterase 3A, cGMP-inhibited

Identifiers
- Symbol: PDE3A
- NCBI gene: 5139
- HGNC: 8778
- OMIM: 123805
- RefSeq: NM_000921
- UniProt: Q14432

Other data
- Locus: Chr. 12 p12
Search for
- Structures: Swiss-model
- Domains: InterPro

phosphodiesterase 3B, cGMP-inhibited

Identifiers
- Symbol: PDE3B
- NCBI gene: 5140
- HGNC: 8779
- OMIM: 602047
- RefSeq: NM_000922
- UniProt: Q13370

Other data
- Locus: Chr. 11 p15.2
Search for
- Structures: Swiss-model
- Domains: InterPro

The PDE3 family in mammals consists of two members, PDE3A and PDE3B. The PDE3 isoforms are structurally similar, containing an N-terminal domain important for the localization and a C-terminus end. The 44-amino acid insertion in the catalytic domain differs in the PDE3 isoforms, and the N-terminal portions of the isoforms are quite divergent. PDE3A and PDE3B have strikingly similar pharmacological and kinetic properties, but the distinction is in expression profiles and affinity for cGMP.

The PDE3 family is composed of two genes, PDE3A and PDE3B. In cells expressing both genes, PDE3A is usually dominant. Three different variants of PDE3A (PDE3A1-3) are products of alternate startcodon usage of the PDE3A gene. The PDE3B encodes a single isoform only.

In their full-length both PDE3A and PDE3B contain two N-terminal hydrophobic membrane association regions, NHR1 and NHR2 (figure 2). The difference of the PDE3A1-3 variants lies in whether they include:

- both NHR1 and NHR2
- only NHR2
- neither NHR1 nor the NHR2.

The last can be predicted to be exclusively on soluble/cytosolic form.

== Tissue distribution ==
PDE3A is mainly implicated in cardiovascular function and fertility but PDE3B is mainly implicated in lipolysis. Table 1 is an overview of localization of the PDE3 isoforms.

	PDE3A	PDE3B
Localization in tissues	– Heart *: Vascular smooth muscle*; Platelets; Oocyte; Kidney	– Vascular smooth muscle: Adipocytes; Hepatocytes; Kidney; β cells; Developing sperm; T-lymphocytes; Macrophages
Intracellular localization	– Membrane-associated or cytosolic	– Membrane-associated (predominantly)
Table 1: Overview of PDE3 isoform localization. *Variants of PDE3A have differential expression in cardiovascular tissues

In general, PDE3 can be either cytosolic or membrane-bound and has been associated to plasma membrane, sarcoplasmic reticulum, golgi, and nucleus envelope.

PDE3B is predominantly membrane-associated, and is localized to endoplasmic reticulum and microsomal fractions.

PDE3A can be either membrane-associated or cytosolic, depending on the variant and the cell type it is expressed in.

== Regulation ==
PDE3A and PDE3B activity is regulated by several phosphorylation pathways. Protein kinase A and protein kinase B both activate PDE3A and PDE3B via phosphorylation at two different phosphorylation sites (P1 and P2) between NHR1 and NHR2 (figure 2). Hydrolysis of cAMP by PDE3 isoforms is also directly inhibited by cGMP, although PDE3B is only ≈10% as sensitive to cGMP inhibition as PDE3A. The PDE3B has been extensively studied for its importance in mediating the antilipolytic and antiglycogenlytic effect of insulin in adipose and liver tissues. The activation of PDE3B in adipocytes is associated with phosphorylation of serine residue by an insulin-stimulated protein serine kinase (PDE3IK). By blocking insulin activation of PDE3IK, and in turn phosphorylation/activation of PDE3B, the antilipolytic effect of insulin can be antagonized. Activation of PDE3B decreases concentrations of cAMP, which in turn reduces protein kinase A activity. Protein kinase A is responsible for activation of lipase, which induces lipolysis as well as other physiological pathways.

Whether phosphorylation pathways, which regulate activity of PDE3A or PDE3B, could serve as potential drug targets rather than the catalytic domain of the PDE3 enzyme itself is unclear and beyond the scope of this text.

== Structure ==
The mammalian PDEs share a common structural organization and contain three functional domains, which include the conserved catalytic core, a regulatory N-terminus, and the C-terminus. The conserved catalytic core is much more similar within PDE families, with about 80% amino acid identity, than between different families. It is believed that the core contains common structural elements that are important for the hydrolysis of cAMP and cGMP phosphodiester bonds. It is also believed that it contains family-specific determinants for differences in affinity for substrates and sensitivity for inhibitors.

The catalytic domain of PDE3 is characterized by a 44-amino acid insert, but this insert is unique to the PDE3 family, and is a factor when determining a structure for a potent and selective PDE3 inhibitor.

The crystal structure of the catalytic domains of several PDEs, including PDE3B, have shown that they contain three helical subdomains:

1. N-terminal cyclin fold region
2. Linker region
3. C-terminal helical bundle

At the interface of these domains a deep hydrophobic pocket is formed by residues that are highly conserved among all PDEs. This pocket is the active site and is composed of four subsites :

1. Metal binding site (M site)
2. Core pocket (Q pocket)
3. Hydrophobic pocket (H pocket)
4. Lid region (L region)

The M site is at the bottom of the hydrophobic binding pocket and contains two divalent metal binding sites. The metal ions that can bind to these sites are either zinc or magnesium. The zinc binding site has two histidine and two aspartic acid residues that are absolutely conserved among those PDEs studied to date.

The N-terminal portions of PDEs are widely divergent and contain determinants that are associated with regulatory properties specific to different gene families. For PDE3, those determinants are the hydrophobic membrane association domains and cAMP-dependent protein kinase phosphorylation sites.

== Substrate affinity ==
At first, the PDE3s were purified and described as enzymes that hydrolyse both cGMP and cAMP with K_{m} values of 0.1–0.8 μM. However the V_{max} for cAMP hydrolysis is 4–10 times higher than V_{max} for cGMP hydrolysis.

When different PDEs were first identified, two types of PDEs (PDE3 and PDE4) that exhibited high affinities for cAMP were isolated. PDE3 exhibited high affinity for both cGMP and cAMP, but PDE4 had high affinity for only cAMP. For that reason, the PDE3 was called the cGMP-inhibited PDE to distinguish it from PDE4.

The 44-amino acid insertion in the catalytic domain of PDE3s is believed to be involved in PDE3's interaction with its substrate and inhibitors, but that remains to be established.

The proposed molecular mechanism of cyclic nucleotide specificity of PDEs is the so-called glutamine switch mechanism.

In the PDEs that have had their structure solved, there seems to be an invariant glutamine residue that stabilizes the binding of the purine ring in the active site (binding pocket). The g-amino group of the glutamine residue can alternatively adopt two different orientations:

1. The hydrogen bond network supports guanine binding – cGMP selectivity
2. The hydrogen bond network supports adenine binding – cAMP selectivity.

In PDEs that can hydrolyse both cGMP and cAMP (PDE3s), the glutamine can rotate freely and therefore switch between orientations.

== Active site ==
From early studies an initial model of PDE, active site topography was derived. This early model can be summarized into the following steps concerning cAMP active site topography:

1. cAMP substrate with its adenine and ribose moieties in an "anti" relationship
2. The phosphate atom in cAMP binds to PDE active site, using an arginine residue and a water molecule, which was initially associated with Mg^{2+}. A second arginine residue and the Mg^{2+} may also play roles during binding and/or play roles in the next step
3. S_{N}2 attack of phosphorus by H_{2}O with formation of a trigonal bipyramid transition state
4. 5´-AMP is formed as an "inverted" product. Electronic charges conserve the net charge overall and across the transition state

== Inhibitors ==
PDE3 inhibitors:

- antagonize platelet aggregation
- block oocyte maturation
- increase contractility of the heart
- enhance vascular smooth muscle relaxation
- enhance airway smooth muscle relaxation

It has been demonstrated that PDE3A inhibition prevents oocyte maturation in vitro and in vivo, more specifically, it has a role in mechanism of maintaining meiotic arrest in oocytes. When mice are made completely deficient of PDE3A, they become infertile.

Aggregation of platelets is highly regulated by cyclic nucleotides. PDE3A is a regulator of this process, and PDE3 inhibitors effectively prevent aggregation of platelets. Cilostazol is approved for treatment of intermittent claudication and is thought to involve inhibition of platelet aggregation and also inhibition of smooth muscle proliferation and vasodilation.

The most studied roles of PDE3B have been in the areas of insulin, IGF1, and leptin signaling. When PDE3B is overexpressed in β-cells in mice, it causes impaired insulin secretion and glucose intolerance.

== Cancer ==
PDE3A expression has been described as a biomarker for sensitivity for PDE3-inhibitor Zardaverine in different types of cancer.

== Asthma ==
Targeting PDE3 with optimal doses and timing, enoximone prevents allergic inflammation in HDM-driven models of allergic airway inflammation. PDE3 inhibitors enoximone and milrinone can be used as a rescue drug in life-threatening bronchial asthma/acute severe asthma.

== See also ==
- Oocyte maturation inhibitor
