= Trequinsin =

Names
- Preferred IUPAC name 9,10-Dimethoxy-3-methyl-2-[(2,4,6-trimethylphenyl)imino]-2,3,6,7-tetrahydro-4H-pyrimido[6,1-a]isoquinolin-4-one

Identifiers
CAS Number	79855-88-2
3D model (JSmol)	Interactive image
ChemSpider	5336
PubChem CID	5537
UNII	739I2958C1
CompTox Dashboard (EPA)	DTXSID2048458
- InChI: InChI=1S/C24H27N3O3/c1-14-9-15(2)23(16(3)10-14)25-22-13-19-18-12-21(30-6)20(29-5)11-17(18)7-8-27(19)24(28)26(22)4/h9-13H,7-8H2,1-6H3 Key: MCMSJVMUSBZUCN-UHFFFAOYSA-N
- SMILES: CC1=CC(=C(C(=C1)C)N=C2C=C3C4=CC(=C(C=C4CCN3C(=O)N2C)OC)OC)C

Properties
Chemical formula	C_{24}H_{27}N_{3}O_{3}
Molar mass	405.498 g·mol^{−1}
- Except where otherwise noted, data are given for materials in their standard state (at 25 °C [77 °F], 100 kPa). Infobox references

Trequinsin is a phosphodiesterase inhibitor. It has been shown to improve sperm motility in vitro.
