= Denopamine =

Chemical compound

Clinical data
- AHFS/Drugs.com: International Drug Names
- Routes of administration: By mouth
- ATC code: none

Legal status
- Legal status: Rx-only (JP)

Identifiers
- IUPAC name: 4-[(1S)-2-[2-(3,4-dimethoxyphenyl)ethylamino]-1-hydroxyethyl]phenol
- CAS Number: 71771-90-9
- PubChem CID: 71754
- IUPHAR/BPS: 534
- ChemSpider: 64795
- UNII: V5F60UPD8P
- KEGG: D02614
- ChEMBL: ChEMBL493682
- CompTox Dashboard (EPA): DTXSID8045800
- ECHA InfoCard: 100.163.233

Chemical and physical data
- Formula: C_{18}H_{23}NO_{4}
- Molar mass: 317.385 g·mol^{−1}
- 3D model (JSmol): Interactive image
- SMILES: O(c1ccc(cc1OC)CCNC[C@@H](O)c2ccc(O)cc2)C

Denopamine (INN) is a drug which acts as a β_{1} adrenergic receptor agonist. It is used in the treatment of angina and may also have potential uses in the treatment of congestive heart failure and for clearing pulmonary edema. It is marketed in Japan under the brand name Kalgut and available as tablets of 5 and 10 mg, and 5% fine granules.
