= Lusitropy =

Rate of relaxation in myocardial muscles

Lusitropy or lucitropy is the rate of myocardial relaxation. The increase in cytosolic calcium of cardiomyocytes via increased uptake leads to increased myocardial contractility (positive inotropic effect), but the myocardial relaxation, or lusitropy, decreases. This should not be confused, however, with catecholamine-induced calcium uptake into the sarcoplasmic reticulum, which increases lusitropy.

== Positive lusitropy ==
Increased catecholamine levels promote positive lusitropy, enabling the heart to relax more rapidly. This effect is mediated by the phosphorylation of phospholamban and troponin I via a cAMP-dependent pathway. Catecholamine-induced calcium influx into the sarcoplasmic reticulum increases both inotropy and lusitropy. In other words, a quicker reduction in cytosolic calcium levels (because the calcium enters the sarcoplasmic reticulum) causes an increased rate of relaxation (a positive lusitropy), however, this also enables a greater degree of calcium efflux, back into the cytosol, when the next action potential arrives, thereby increasing inotropy as well. However, unlike the previously mentioned mechanism, a calcium uptake from the extracellular fluid into the cytosol without any catecholamine stimulation simply results in a sustained rise in calcium concentration in the cytosol. This only serves to increase inotropy but doesn't allow total relaxation of the cardiac myocytes between contractions, decreasing lusitropy.

== Negative lusitropy ==
Relaxation of the heart is negatively impacted by the following factors:

1. Calcium overload – too much intracellular calcium
2. Reduced rate of calcium removal from myocyte through pumps if calcium is not removed from the cell quickly enough.
  a. Plasma membrane Calcium ATPase (Ca ATPase) this primary active transporter pumps calcium out of the myocyte between beats
  b. Sodium-Calcium (Na/Ca) exchanger this secondary active transporter pumps calcium out of cell between beats
3. Impaired Sarco-Endoplasmic Reticulum Calcium ATPase (SERCA) this primary active transporter pumps calcium from the cytoplasm of the myocyte into its sarco-endoplasmic reticulum.

Therefore, any impairment of the transporters in (2) and (3) would have a negative lusitropic effect.

In contrast, enhancement of these same transporters would have a positive inotropic effect
