= Cardiogenic shock =

Shock due to heart dysfunction

- Ultrasound image after cardiogenic shock due to myocarditis
- Specialty: Cardiology, emergency medicine
- Symptoms: Fatigue, rapid heartbeat, shortness of breath, hypotension, sweating, chest pain, dizziness or lightheadedness, nausea, decreased level of consciousness
- Complications: Worsening of or causing heart failure and/or heart block, serious arrhythmias such as ventricular fibrillation, cor pulmonale, respiratory or kidney or liver dysfunction or failure, multiple organ dysfunction syndrome, cardiac arrest, death
- Causes: Heart attack, myocarditis, endocarditis, certain medications and substances, blunt cardiac injury
- Risk factors: Heart failure, old age, hypertension
- Prognosis: 60% mortality in cardiogenic shock not related to heart attack 30-day mortality 40% for cardiogenic shock due to heart attack

Cardiogenic shock is a medical emergency resulting from inadequate blood flow to the body's organs due to the dysfunction of the heart. Signs of inadequate blood flow include low urine production (<30 mL/hour), cool arms and legs, and decreased level of consciousness. People may also have severely low blood pressure.

Causes of cardiogenic shock include cardiomyopathic, arrhythmic, and mechanical. Cardiogenic shock is most commonly precipitated by a heart attack. Cardiogenic shock is estimated to complicate 5-10% of all heart attacks.

Treatment of cardiogenic shock depends on the cause, with the initial goals to improve blood flow to the body. If cardiogenic shock is due to a heart attack, attempts to open the heart's arteries may help. Certain medications, such as dobutamine and milrinone, improve the heart's ability to contract and can also be used. When these measures fail, more advanced options such as mechanical support devices (such as an intra-aortic balloon pump or left ventricular assist device).

Cardiogenic shock is a condition that is difficult to reverse fully, even with an early diagnosis. However, early initiation of treatment may improve outcomes. Care should also be directed to any other organs that are affected by this lack of blood flow (e.g., dialysis for the kidneys, mechanical ventilation for lung dysfunction).

Mortality rates for cardiogenic shock are high but have been decreasing in the United States. This is likely due to its rapid identification and treatment in recent decades. Some studies have suggested that this is possibly related to new treatment advances. The 30-day mortality rate for cardiogenic shock after a heart attack is 40%, with a 1-year mortality rate of 50%. Nonetheless, the mortality rates remain high, and multi-organ failure, in addition to cardiogenic shock, is associated with higher rates of mortality.

== Signs and symptoms ==
Cardiogenic shock may present as shortness of breath (respiratory distress) due to fluid buildup in the lungs (pulmonary edema). Reduced perfusion to the brain can cause drowsiness, with anoxic brain injury causing coma and death. Low blood pressure due to decrease in cardiac output may cause circulatory shock with symptoms of a rapid, weak pulse due to decreased circulation, cool, clammy, and mottled skin (cutis marmorata) due to vasoconstriction and subsequent hypoperfusion of the skin, low urine output, confusion. Increased heart filling pressures can cause orthopnea and distended jugular veins due to increased jugular venous pressure.

== Causes ==
Cardiogenic shock is caused by the failure of the heart to pump effectively. It is due to damage to the heart muscle, most often from a heart attack. Other causes include abnormal heart rhythms, cardiomyopathy, heart valve problems, ventricular outflow obstruction (i.e. systolic anterior motion in hypertrophic cardiomyopathy), myocardial contusion or ventriculoseptal defects. It can also be caused by a sudden depressurization (e.g. in an aircraft), where air bubbles are released into the bloodstream (Henry's law), causing heart failure.

In cardiogenic shock due to a heart attack, shock can develop at the time of the heart attack or after. The median time from heart attack to developing shock was about 5.5–6 hours. In a registry study, 74% of people developed shock within 24 hours of the heart attack, with 46.6% developing shock within 6 hours of the heart attack. The left anterior descending artery and the left main coronary artery are the two most commonly blocked arteries in heart attacks that lead to cardiogenic shock.

== Diagnosis ==
=== Electrocardiogram ===
An electrocardiogram is recommended for those with cardiogenic shock, and can assess for heart muscle damage or abnormal heart rhythms or rate.

=== Echocardiography ===
An echocardiogram can assess for structural heart disease or complications due to cardiogenic shock. Some structural complications include ventricular free wall rupture, interventricular septum rupture, papillary muscle rupture with acute mitral valve regurgitation. These structural complications are associated with a high mortality and can severely worsen cardiogenic shock.

Ultrasound showing cardiogenic shock due to myocarditis

Ultrasound showing cardiogenic shock due to myocarditis

=== Pulmonary artery catheter ===
A pulmonary artery catheter, which can provide invasive hemodynamic monitoring (such as the pulmonary capillary wedge pressure, pulmonary artery pressure, and other markers of heart function), can provide valuable information regarding disease severity and response to treatment. Invasive hemodynamic monitoring was associated with lower mortality in those with cardiogenic shock due to a heart attack based on observational data, but randomized trials are lacking.

=== Biopsy ===
When cardiomyopathy of an unknown cause is suspected as the cause of cardiogenic shock, a biopsy of heart muscle may be needed to make a definite diagnosis.

=== Cardiac index ===
If the cardiac index falls acutely below 2.2 L/min/m^{2}, the person may be in cardiogenic shock, but a consensus value is not established.

== Treatment ==
=== Medication therapy ===
Initial management of cardiogenic shock involves medications to augment the heart's function. Certain medications, such as dobutamine or milrinone, enhance the heart's pumping function and are often used first-line to improve low blood pressure and the delivery of blood to the rest of the body.

Patients who have cardiogenic shock unresponsive to medication therapy may be candidates for more advanced options such as a mechanical circulatory support device. There are several types of mechanical circulatory support devices, the most common being intra-aortic balloon pumps, left ventricular assist devices, and venous-arterial extra-corporeal membrane oxygenation. None of these devices is a permanent solution but rather is a bridge to a more definitive therapy, such as a heart transplantation, surgical correction of the heart, or coronary revascularization.

=== Coronary revascularization ===
In cardiogenic shock due to a heart attack, revascularization of the occluded coronary artery is shown to reduce mortality. Early revascularization is associated with better outcomes. It is unclear if multi-vessel revascularization (revascularizing other coronary arteries that are not occluded, in addition to the culprit coronary artery) has additional benefit.

=== Intra-aortic balloon pump ===
An intra-aortic balloon pump is a device placed by a cardiac surgeon into the descending aorta. It consists of a small balloon filled with helium that helps the heart to pump blood by inflating during diastole (the resting phase of the cardiac cycle) and deflating during systole (the contracting phase of the cardiac cycle). Intra-aortic balloon pumps do not directly increase cardiac output, but importantly, they decrease the amount of pressure that the heart has to pump against, thereby allowing for more blood flow and oxygen to be delivered to the heart muscles.

Intra-aortic balloon pumps have been available for several decades and are most commonly used as the first-line mechanical circulatory support devices. However, it is not without its potential complications. Potential complications include injury upon insertion of the device to arteries supplying the spinal cord, as well as risks with any procedure, such as bleeding and infection. Contraindications to intra-aortic balloon pumps include aortic dissection, an abdominal aortic aneurysm, and irregularly fast heartbeats.

=== Left ventricular assist device ===
There are several types of left ventricular assist devices, with the Impella devices among the most common. A cardiac surgeon places this device in the left ventricle of the heart. It essentially acts as a pump, drawing blood from the left ventricle and pushing it out into the aorta, so it can be delivered to the rest of the body. Unlike intra-aortic balloon pumps, the Impella acts independently from the cardiac cycle. It can be adjusted to pump at faster rates to take blood out of the left ventricle and into the aorta more quickly, thereby decreasing the amount of work that the left ventricle has to do. While the Impella is commonly used in settings of cardiogenic shock, some evidence suggests that placing an Impella device in an acute cardiogenic shock setting, where the heart suddenly fails to pump, may not necessarily guarantee increased survival.

Potential complications specific to an Impella device include hemolysis (shearing of the blood cells) as well as the formation of lesions on the heart valve, namely the mitral or aortic valves. Contraindications to an Impella device insertion include aortic dissection, the presence of a mechanical aortic valve, and the presence of a blood clot in the left ventricle.

=== Venous-arterial extra-corporeal membrane oxygenation ===
Venous-arterial extra-corporeal membrane oxygenation is a circuit support system that is meant to replace the function of the heart as it heals or awaits a more definitive treatment. It consists of a circuit that essentially drains blood from a patient's venous system, runs that blood through a circulator which adds oxygen and removes carbon dioxide, and ultimately returns blood into the patient's arterial system where the newly oxygenated blood can be delivered to the person's organs. Some evidence suggests that the combination of both an Impella device and Venous-arterial extra-corporeal membrane oxygenation may decrease the heart's pulmonary capillary wedge pressure, thereby decreasing the amount of stress on the cardiac muscles.

Because venous-arterial extra-corporeal membrane oxygenation is an invasive procedure, it is not usually a first-line option in cardiogenic shock and is often reserved only for people who have cardiogenic shock refractory to other treatments or devices or concomitant cardiac arrest.

Complications of venous-arterial extra-corporeal membrane oxygenation include an air embolism, pulmonary edema, and blood clotting in the circuit machine. It may also increase left ventricular afterload (causing the heart to pump against higher pressures) or cause pulmonary edema.

== See also ==
- Shock (circulatory)
- Low cardiac output syndrome
- Myocardial infarction
- Angina
