= Levosimendan =

Pharmaceutical drug

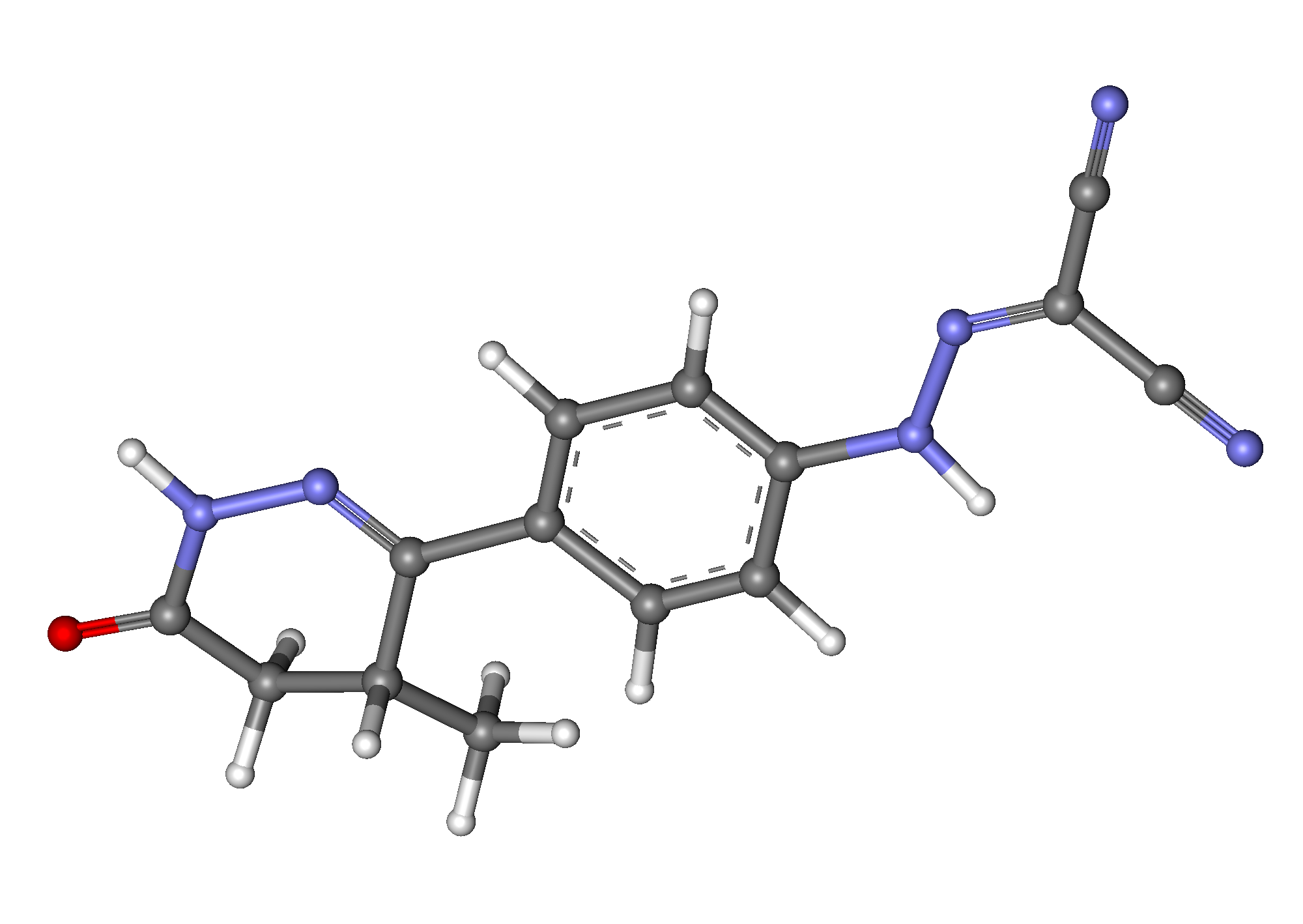

Clinical data
- Pronunciation: /ˌliːvoʊˈsɪmɛndæn/
- Trade names: Simdax
- AHFS/Drugs.com: International Drug Names
- Routes of administration: IV
- Drug class: Calcium sensitizer
- ATC code: C01CX08 (WHO)

Legal status
- Legal status: In general: ℞ (Prescription only)

Pharmacokinetic data
- Bioavailability: 85% (oral)
- Protein binding: 97–98%
- Metabolism: Extensive hepatic
- Elimination half-life: ~1 hour (levosimendan), 75–80 hours (metabolites)
- Excretion: urine (54%), feces (44%)

Identifiers
- IUPAC name: 2-[[4-[(4R)-4-methyl-6-oxo-4,5-dihydro-1H-pyridazin-3-yl]phenyl]hydrazinylidene]propanedinitrile
- CAS Number: 141505-33-1
- PubChem CID: 3033825
- DrugBank: DB00922
- ChemSpider: 2298414
- UNII: C6T4514L4E
- KEGG: D04720
- ChEBI: CHEBI:50567
- ChEMBL: ChEMBL313136
- CompTox Dashboard (EPA): DTXSID9046445
- ECHA InfoCard: 100.189.828

Chemical and physical data
- Formula: C_{14}H_{12}N_{6}O
- Molar mass: 280.291 g·mol^{−1}
- 3D model (JSmol): Interactive image
- SMILES: O=C2N/N=C(/c1ccc(N/N=C(\C#N)C#N)cc1)[C@H](C)C2
- InChI: InChI=1S/C14H12N6O/c1-9-6-13(21)19-20-14(9)10-2-4-11(5-3-10)17-18-12(7-15)8-16/h2-5,9,17H,6H2,1H3,(H,19,21)/t9-/m1/s1; Key:WHXMKTBCFHIYNQ-SECBINFHSA-N

Levosimendan (INN) is a calcium sensitizer used in the management of acutely decompensated congestive heart failure. It is marketed under the trade name Simdax (Orion Corporation). Overall the drug has a two fold mechanism of action. It leads to greater inotropy by increasing the calcium sensitivity as it binds to troponin and this results in a greater positive inotrophic force. Secondly, the drug is able to open ATP-sensitive potassium channels in vascular smooth muscle cells, and the vascular dilatory effects of the drug lead to a decreased preload and afterload, putting less work on the heart. This drug is in the process of review by the FDA but has not been approved for use in the United States yet.

== Mechanism of action ==
Levosimendan is a calcium sensitizer — it increases the sensitivity of the heart to calcium, thus increasing cardiac contractility without a rise in intracellular calcium. Levosimendan exerts its positive inotropic effect by increasing calcium sensitivity of myocytes by binding to cardiac troponin C in a calcium-dependent manner. It also has a vasodilatory effect, by opening adenosine triphosphate (ATP)-sensitive potassium channels in vascular smooth muscle to cause smooth muscle relaxation. The combined inotropic and vasodilatory actions result in an increased force of contraction, decreased preload and decreased afterload. Moreover, by opening also the mitochondrial (ATP)-sensitive potassium channels in cardiomyocytes, the drug exerts a cardioprotective effect.

== Clinical use ==
=== Indications ===
Levosimendan is indicated for inotropic support in acutely-decompensated severe congestive heart failure in situations where conventional therapy is not sufficient, and in cases where inotropic support is considered appropriate.

Some of the Phase III studies in the extensive clinical program including the trials LIDO (200 patients), RUSSLAN (500), REVIVE-I (100), REVIVE-II (600) and SURVIVE (1350). In total, the clinical data base includes more than 3500 patients in Phase IIb and III double-blind randomized studies.

In the SURVIVE study, despite a reduction in plasma B-type natriuretic peptide level in patients in the levosimendan group compared with patients in the dobutamine group, levosimendan did not significantly reduce all-cause mortality at 180 days. However, in a retrospective subgroup analysis, Levosimendan was superior to dobutamine for treating patients with a history of CHF or those on beta-blocker therapy when they were hospitalized with acute decompensations.

=== Licensing status ===
The Orion Corporation originally developed levosimendan and applied for a new drug application in 1998 in the U.S. However the Food and Drug Administration (FDA) requested further trials be conducted and Orion withdrew the application in November 1999. Initially, Orion obtained the approval to market the drug in Sweden in 2000. Since then 60 countries worldwide have approved the drug for acute cardiac care, but it remains unapproved in North America, where it is currently in Phase III development by Tenax Therapeutics for reduction in morbidity in patients with Pulmonary Hypertension derived from Heart Failure with preserved Ejection Faction (PH-HFpEF).

=== Contraindications ===
The use of levosimendan is contraindicated in patients with moderate-to-severe kidney impairment, severe liver impairment, severe ventricular filling or outflow obstruction, very low blood pressure and fast heart rate, and/or history of the abnormal heart rhythm torsades de pointes.

=== Adverse effects ===
Common adverse drug reactions (≥1% of patients) associated with levosimendan therapy include: headache, hypotension, arrhythmias (atrial fibrillation, extrasystoles, Atrial tachycardia, ventricular tachycardia), myocardial ischaemia, hypokalaemia and/or nausea (Rossi, 2006).

=== Formulations ===
Levosimendan is marketed as a 2.5 mg/mL concentrated solution for IV infusion. The concentrate is diluted with glucose 5% solution before infusion.
