= Myocardial contractility =

Heart muscle's ability to contract

Myocardial contractility represents the innate ability of the heart muscle (cardiac muscle or myocardium) to contract. It is the maximum attainable value for the force of contraction of a given heart. The ability to produce changes in force during contraction result from incremental degrees of binding between different types of tissue, that is, between filaments of myosin (thick) and actin (thin) tissue. The degree of binding depends upon the concentration of calcium ions in the cell. Within an in vivo intact heart, the action/response of the sympathetic nervous system is driven by precisely timed releases of a catecholamine, which is a process that determines the concentration of calcium ions in the cytosol of cardiac muscle cells. The factors causing an increase in contractility work by causing an increase in intracellular calcium ions (Ca^{++}) during contraction.

== Mechanisms for altering contractility ==
Increasing contractility is done primarily through increasing the influx of calcium or maintaining higher calcium levels in the cytosol of cardiac myocytes during an action potential. This is done by a number of mechanisms:

1. Sympathetic activation. Increased circulating levels of catecholamines (which can bind to β-Adrenergic activation) as well as stimulation by sympathetic nerves (which can release norepinepherine that binds to β_{1}-adrenoceptors on myocytes) causes the G_{s} subunit of the receptor to render adenylate cyclase activated, resulting in increase of cAMP - which has a number of effects including phosphorylating phospholamban (via Protein kinase A).
2. Phosphorylating phospholamban. When phospholamban is not phosphorylated, it inhibits the calcium pumps that pump calcium back into the sarcoplasmic reticulum. When it's phosphorylated by PKA, levels of calcium stored in the sarcoplasmic reticulum are increased, allowing a higher rate of calcium being released at the next contraction. However, the increased rate of calcium sequestration also leads to an increase in lusitropy.
3. Sensitizing troponin-C to the effects of calcium.
4. Phosphorylating L-type calcium channels. This will increase their permeability to calcium, allowing more calcium into the myocyte cells, increasing contractility.
5. An abrupt increase in afterload enhances myocardial contractility and prolongs systolic ejection time through the Anrep effect. This response involves a two-phase recruitment of myosin from resting states to contraction-ready configurations, boosting the heart's contractile force.
6. An increase in heart rate also stimulates inotropy (Bowditch effect; treppe; frequency-dependent inotropy). This is probably due to the inability of Na^{+}/K^{+}-ATPase to keep up with the sodium influx at the higher frequency of action potentials at elevated heart rates
7. Drugs. Drugs like digitalis can act as a positive inotropic agent by inhibiting the Na^{+}/K^{+} pump. High Na^{+} concentration gradient is necessary to pump out sarcoplasmic calcium via the Na^{+}/Ca^{++} antiporter. Inhibition of the Na^{+}/K^{+} causes extra sodium to accumulate inside the cell. The buildup the Na^{+} concentration inside the cell will cause the gradient from inside the cell to the outside of the cell to decrease slightly. This action will make it more difficult for calcium to leave the cell via the Na^{+}/Ca^{++} antiporter.
8. Increase the amount of calcium in the sarcoplasm. More calcium available for Troponin to use will increase the force developed.

Decreasing contractility is done primarily by decreasing the influx of calcium or maintaining lower calcium levels in the cytosol of cardiac myocytes during an action potential. This is done by a number of mechanisms:

1. Parasympathetic activation.
2. If the heart is experiencing anoxia, hypercapnia (increased CO_{2}) or acidosis, the heart cells will enter a state of dysfunction and not work properly. Correct sarcomere crossbridges will not form the heart becomes less efficient (leading to myocardial failure).
3. Loss of parts of the myocardium. Heart attack can cause a section of the ventricular wall dies off, that portion cannot contract and there is less force developed during systole.

== Inotropy ==
A measurable relative increase in contractility is a property of the myocardium similar to the term "inotropy". Contractility may be iatrogenically altered by the administration of inotropic agents. Drugs that positively render the effects of catecholamines such as norepinephrine and epinephrine that enhance contractility are considered to have a positive inotropic effect. The ancient herbal remedy digitalis appears to have both inotropic and chronotropic properties that have been recorded encyclopedically for centuries and it remains advantageous today.

== Model as a contributing factor ==
Under one existing model, the five factors of myocardial performance are considered to be

- Heart rate
- Conduction velocity
- Preload
- Afterload
- Contractility

By this model, if myocardial performance changes while preload, afterload, heart rate, and conduction velocity are all held constant, then the change in performance must be due to a change in contractility. However, changes in contractility alone generally do not occur. Other examples:

- An increase in sympathetic stimulation to the heart increases contractility and heart rate.
- An increase in contractility tends to increase stroke volume and thus a secondary increase in preload.
- An increase in preload results in an increased force of contraction by Starling's law of the heart; this does not require a change in contractility.
- An increase in afterload will increase contractility (through the Anrep effect).
- An increase in heart rate will increase contractility (through the Bowditch effect).
