= Enoximone =

Chemical compound

Clinical data
- Trade names: Perfan
- AHFS/Drugs.com: International Drug Names
- Routes of administration: Intravenous
- ATC code: C01CE03 (WHO)

Legal status
- Legal status: UK: POM (Prescription only)

Pharmacokinetic data
- Bioavailability: 50% (oral)
- Protein binding: 85%
- Metabolism: Liver (oxidation)
- Elimination half-life: 4 to 10 hours
- Excretion: Renal (60 to 70%)

Identifiers
- IUPAC name: 4-Methyl-5-{[4-(methylsulfanyl)phenyl]carbonyl}-2,3-dihydro-1H-imidazol-2-one
- CAS Number: 77671-31-9
- PubChem CID: 53708
- DrugBank: DB04880
- ChemSpider: 48492
- UNII: C7Z4ITI7L7
- KEGG: D04004
- ChEMBL: ChEMBL249856
- CompTox Dashboard (EPA): DTXSID8045147
- ECHA InfoCard: 100.419.380

Chemical and physical data
- Formula: C_{12}H_{12}N_{2}O_{2}S
- Molar mass: 248.30 g·mol^{−1}
- 3D model (JSmol): Interactive image
- Melting point: 255 to 258 °C (491 to 496 °F) (decomposes)
- SMILES: O=C(/C1=C(/NC(=O)N1)C)c2ccc(SC)cc2
- InChI: InChI=1S/C12H12N2O2S/c1-7-10(14-12(16)13-7)11(15)8-3-5-9(17-2)6-4-8/h3-6H,1-2H3,(H2,13,14,16); Key:ZJKNESGOIKRXQY-UHFFFAOYSA-N

Enoximone (INN, trade name Perfan) is an imidazolinone phosphodiesterase inhibitor. It is used in the treatment of congestive heart failure and is selective for phosphodiesterase 3.

== Medical uses ==
Enoximone produces haemodynamic improvement and a fall in pulmonary wedge pressure and vascular resistance. It is used as short-term treatment in acute decompensated heart failure and as a bridge to cardiac transplantation.

However a systematic review of oral phosphodiesterase 3 inhibitors in chronic heart failure, found that longer-term use of enoximone was associated with an increased risk of arrhythmia and mortality, which has limited its role to short-term, intravenous therapy rather than chronic oral treatment.

== Pharmacology ==
=== Pharmacokinetics ===
Enoximone has an elimination half-life in the range of 4–10 hours with about 85% plasma protein binding.

=== Pharmacodynamics ===
Enoximone is a imidazolone derivative that acts as a selective phosphodiesterase 3 (and, to a lesser extent, 4) inhibitor, raising intracellular cyclic AMP in cardiac and vascular smooth muscle to produce positive inotropic and vasodilator effects without significantly increasing cardiac oxygen demand.
