= Milrinone =

Chemical compound

Clinical data
- AHFS/Drugs.com: Monograph
- MedlinePlus: a601020
- License data: US DailyMed: Milrinone
- Routes of administration: Intravenous
- ATC code: C01CE02 (WHO)

Legal status
- Legal status: US: ℞-only; EU: Rx-only; In general: ℞ (Prescription only)

Pharmacokinetic data
- Bioavailability: 100%
- Protein binding: 70 to 80%
- Metabolism: Liver (12%)
- Elimination half-life: 2.3 hours (mean, in CHF)
- Excretion: Kidney (85% as unchanged drug) within 24 hours

Identifiers
- IUPAC name: 2-Methyl-6-oxo-1,6-dihydro-3,4'-bipyridine-5-carbonitrile
- CAS Number: 78415-72-2
- PubChem CID: 4197
- IUPHAR/BPS: 5225
- DrugBank: DB00235
- ChemSpider: 4052
- UNII: JU9YAX04C7
- KEGG: D00417
- ChEBI: CHEBI:50693
- ChEMBL: ChEMBL189
- CompTox Dashboard (EPA): DTXSID5023324
- ECHA InfoCard: 100.071.709

Chemical and physical data
- Formula: C_{12}H_{9}N_{3}O
- Molar mass: 211.224 g·mol^{−1}
- 3D model (JSmol): Interactive image
- Density: 1.344 g/cm^{3}
- Melting point: 315 °C (599 °F)
- SMILES: c1cnccc1-c2c(C)[nH]c(=O)c(C#N)c2
- InChI: InChI=1S/C12H9N3O/c1-8-11(9-2-4-14-5-3-9)6-10(7-13)12(16)15-8/h2-6H,1H3,(H,15,16); Key:PZRHRDRVRGEVNW-UHFFFAOYSA-N

Milrinone, sold under the brand name Primacor among others, is a pulmonary vasodilator used in patients who have heart failure. It is a phosphodiesterase 3 inhibitor that works to increase the heart's contractility and decrease pulmonary vascular resistance. Milrinone also works to vasodilate which helps alleviate increased pressures (afterload) on the heart, thus improving its pumping action. While it has been used in people with heart failure for many years, studies suggest that milrinone may exhibit some negative side effects that have caused some debate about its use clinically.

Overall, milrinone supports ventricular functioning of the heart by decreasing the degradation of cyclic adenosine monophosphate (cAMP) and thus increasing phosphorylation levels of many components in the heart that contribute to contractility and heart rate. Milrinone is used as a drug that causes positive inotropy and it will lead to an increased force of contraction. Milrinone use following cardiac surgery has been under some debate because of the potential increase risk of postoperative atrial arrhythmias. However, in the short term milrinone has been deemed beneficial to those experiencing heart failure and an effective therapy to maintain heart function following cardiac surgeries. There is no evidence of any long term beneficial effects on survival. In critically ill patients with evidence of cardiac dysfunction there is limited good quality evidence to recommend its use.

Milrinone is administered intravenously and eliminated unchanged in the urine.

== Medical uses ==
Milrinone is a commonly used therapy for severe pulmonary arterial hypertension (PAH), often in combination with other medications such as sildenafil. Targeting PDE3 with optimal doses and timing, milrinone prevents allergic inflammation in HDM-driven models of allergic airway inflammation.

It can be used in cardiopulmonary bypass cases, as it increases the flow in saphenous grafts and has a beneficiary effect in left ventricle function.

== Adverse effects ==
Common adverse effects include ventricular arrhythmias (including ventricular ectopy and nonsustained ventricular tachycardia), supraventricular arrhythmias, hypotension, and headache.

== Contractility in the heart ==
People experiencing some forms of heart failure have a significant decrease in the contractile ability of muscle cells in the heart (cardiomyocytes). This impaired contractility occurs through a number of mechanisms. Some of the main problems associated with decreased contractility in those with heart failure are issues arising from imbalances in the concentration of calcium. Calcium permits myosin and actin to interact which allows initiation of contraction within the cardiomyocytes. In those with heart failure there may be a decreased amount of calcium within the cardiomyocytes reducing the available calcium to initiate contraction. When contractility is decreased the amount of blood being pumped out of the heart into circulation is decreased as well. This reduction in cardiac output can cause many systemic implications such as fatigue, syncope and other issues associated with decreased blood flow to peripheral tissues.

== Mechanism of action ==
Milrinone is a phosphodiesterase-3 inhibitor. It inhibits the action of phosphodiesterase-3 and thus prevents degradation of cyclic adenosine monophosphate (cAMP). Normally, cyclic adenosine monophosphate causes increased activation of protein kinase A (PKA). Protein kinase A is an enzyme that phosphorylates many elements of the contractile machinery within the heart cell. In the short term this leads to an increased force of contraction. Phosphodiesterases are enzymes responsible for the breakdown of cyclic adenosine monophosphate. Therefore, when phosphodiesterases lower the level of cyclic adenosine monophosphate in the cell they also lower the active fraction of protein kinase A within the cell and reduce the force of contraction.

With increased levels of cyclic adenosine monophosphate there is an increase in the activation of protein kinase A. The protein kinase A will phosphorylate many components of the cardiomyocyte such as calcium channels and components of the myofilaments. Phosphorylation of calcium channels permits an increase in calcium influx into the cell. This increase in calcium influx results in increased contractility. Protein kinase A also phosphorylates potassium channels promoting their action. Potassium channels are responsible for repolarization of the cardiomyocytes therefore increasing the rate at which cells can depolarize and generate contraction. The protein kinase A also phosphorylates components on myofilaments allowing actin and myosin to interact more easily and thus increasing contractility and the inotropic state of the heart. Milrinone allows stimulation of cardiac function independently of β-adrenergic receptors which appear to be down-regulated in those with heart failure.

== Synthesis ==
Thieme Patents: Journal syntheses: Sino ultramodern: Prec:
