= Inotrope =

Agent that alters the strength of muscular contractions

An inotrope (Note: The word inotrope is ISV via Neo-Latin, from Greek in-, fibre or sinew, plus -trope, turning or moving. The prevalent pronunciations are /ˈaɪnətroʊp, -noʊt-/ and /ˈɪn-/, with /ˈiːn-/ being less common.) or inotropic is a drug or any substance that alters the force or energy of muscular contractions. Negatively inotropic agents weaken the force of muscular contractions. Positively inotropic agents increase the strength of muscular contraction.

The term inotropic state is most commonly used in reference to various drugs that affect the strength of contraction of heart muscle. However, it can also refer to pathological conditions. For example, enlarged heart muscle can increase inotropic state, whereas dead heart muscle can decrease it.

== Medical uses ==
Both positive and negative inotropes are used in the management of various cardiovascular conditions. The choice of agent depends largely on specific pharmacological effects of individual agents with respect to the condition. One of the most important factors affecting inotropic state is the level of calcium in the cytoplasm of the muscle cell. Positive inotropes usually increase this level, while negative inotropes decrease it. However, not all positive and negative drugs affect calcium release, and, among those that do, the mechanism for manipulating the calcium level can differ from drug to drug.

While it is often recommended that vasopressors are given through a central line due to the risk of local tissue injury if the medication enters the local tissues, they are likely safe when given for less than two hours through good peripheral intravenous catheterization.

== Positive inotropic agents ==
By increasing the concentration of intracellular calcium or increasing the sensitivity of receptor proteins to calcium, positive inotropic agents can increase myocardial contractility. Concentrations of intracellular calcium can be increased by increasing influx into the cell or stimulating release from the sarcoplasmic reticulum.

Once in the cell, calcium can pass through one of two channels: the L-type calcium channel (long-lasting) and the T-type calcium channel (transient). These channels respond to voltage changes across the membrane differently: L-type channels respond to higher membrane potentials, open more slowly, and remain open longer than T-type channels.

Because of these properties, L-type channels are important in sustaining an action potential, while T-type channels are important in initiating them.

By increasing intracellular calcium, via the action of the L-type channels, the action potential can be sustained for longer and therefore, contractility increases.

Positive inotropes are used to support cardiac function in conditions such as decompensated congestive heart failure, cardiogenic shock, septic shock, myocardial infarction, cardiomyopathy, etc.

Examples of positive inotropic agents include:

- Digoxin
- Berberine
- Calcium
- Calcium sensitisers
  - Levosimendan
- Catecholamines
  - Dopamine
  - Dobutamine
  - Dopexamine
  - Adrenaline (epinephrine)
  - Isoproterenol (isoprenaline)
  - Noradrenaline (norepinephrine)
- Angiotensin II
- Eicosanoids
  - Prostaglandins
- Phosphodiesterase inhibitors
  - Enoximone
  - Milrinone
  - Amrinone
  - Theophylline
- Glucagon
- Insulin

== Negative inotropic agents ==
Negative inotropic agents decrease myocardial contractility and are used to decrease cardiac workload in conditions such as angina. While negative inotropism may precipitate or exacerbate heart failure in the short term, certain beta blockers (e.g. carvedilol, bisoprolol and metoprolol) have been believed to reduce long-term morbidity and mortality in congestive heart failure.

Examples of negative inotropic agents include:

- Beta blockers
- Non-dihydropyridine Calcium channel blockers
  - Diltiazem
  - Verapamil

Class IA antiarrhythmics such as

- Quinidine
- Procainamide
- Disopyramide

Class IC antiarrhythmics such as

- Flecainide
- Isovoacangine
- Voacristine

== See also ==
- Bathmotropic
- Dromotropic
- Vasoconstrictors
