= Hezbollah–Syria clashes (2024–present) =

Series of clashes on the Lebanon–Syria border

Lebanon-Syria border conflict
- Part of the spillover of the Aftermath of the Syrian civil war after the civil war, the aftermath of the fall of the Assad regime
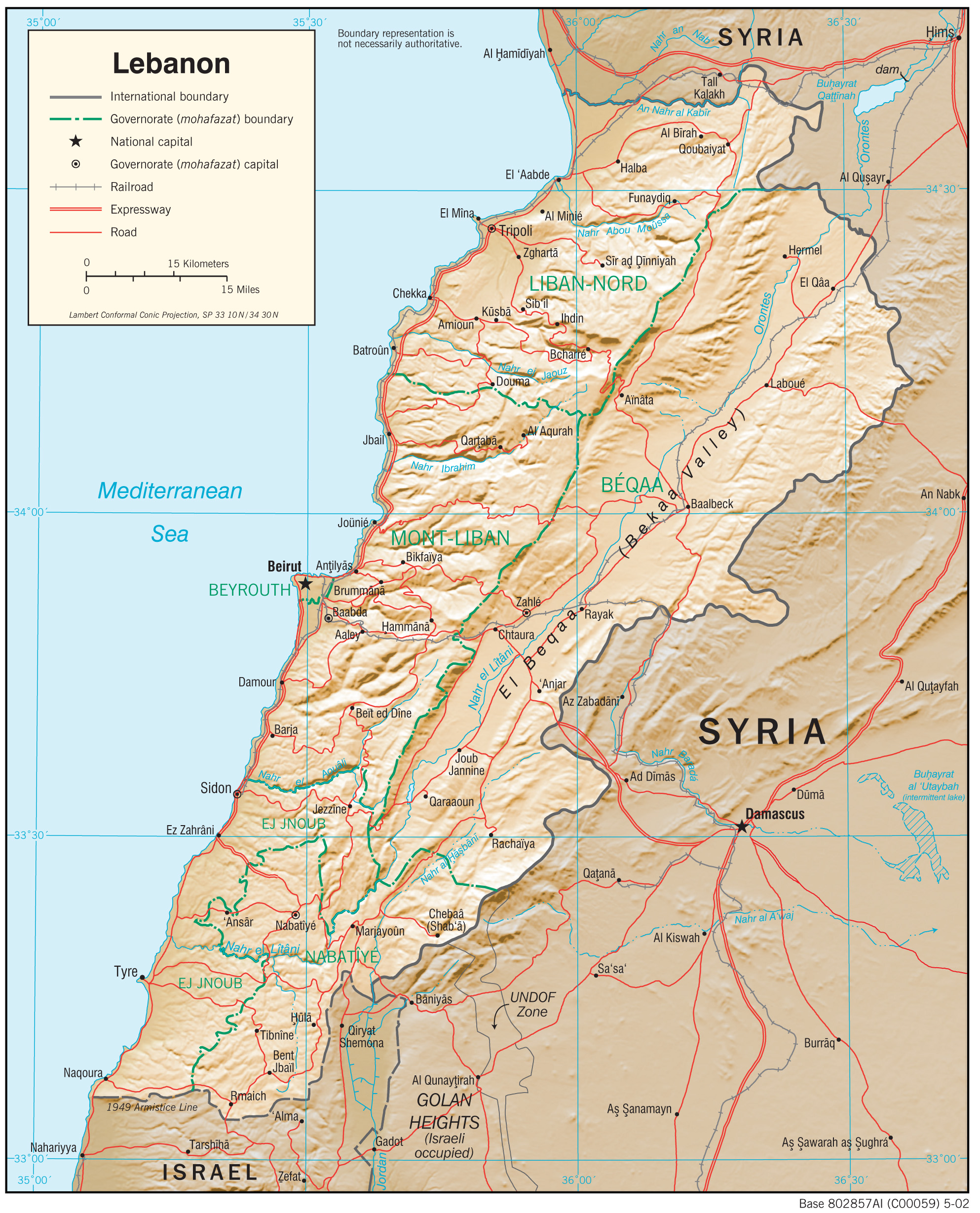
- Map of Lebanon with Syria bordering to the east
Date	8 December 2024 – present (Hezbollah–Syria) (1 year, 10 months, 1 week and 2 days); 15 March 2025 – 17 March 2025 (Lebanon–Syria) (2 days)
Location	Lebanon–Syria border
Status	Ongoing: Syrian security forces crack down on Hezbollah-linked smuggling networks along the Western Syrian border regions; Lebanese army launches raids against Hezbollah holdouts in the northern Lebanon border regions; Syrian forces temporarily occupy the Lebanese villages of Hawch Beit Ismail and Qasr prompting a military response from the Lebanese army and eventual ceasefire.

Belligerents
Syria HTS linked fighters/Sunni Islamist fighters	Hezbollah; Syrian Popular Resistance; Abbas Shield Martyrdom Forces; (Lebanon) Eastern Shia Lebanese clans	Lebanon

Commanders and leaders
(Syria) Ahmed al-Sharaa (Syria) Murhaf Abu Qasra (Syria) Ali Noureddine al-Naasan	(Hezbollah) Naim Qassem	(Lebanon) Joseph Aoun (Lebanon) Rodolphe Haykal

Units involved
(Syria) Syrian Armed Forces	Hezbollah Military wing	(Lebanon) Lebanese Armed Forces

Casualties and losses
(Syria) 5–40 soldiers and militiamen killed (Syria) 2 soldiers captured (Syria) 2 Shaheen drones shot down	(Hezbollah) 7 fighters injured (Hezbollah) (Lebanon) 18 smugglers arrested	(Lebanon) 2 soldiers injured (Lebanon) 8 Lebanese civilians injured (Lebanon) 16 Lebanese civilians arrested

Since the fall of the Assad regime on 8 December 2024 following a HTS-led Syrian opposition offensive, several clashes have occurred between the newly formed Syrian transitional government and Hezbollah, which had previously backed the Assad regime throughout the Syrian civil war, primarily along the Lebanon–Syria border. The clashes primarily revolve around geopolitical animosities and Captagon smuggling issues, as the new Syrian government seeks to prevent Iranian weapon transfers to Hezbollah.

The confrontations escalated on 16 March 2025, when Hezbollah-affiliated militants kidnapped and murdered three Syrian soldiers near Zeita Dam in the west of Homs. The conflict led to the involvement of the Lebanese Armed Forces, creating a destabilized security situation characterized by cross-border artillery exchanges, military buildups along the border, and increasing humanitarian concerns for civilian safety. The instability represented one of the most serious cross-border incidents between the two nations since border clashes from 2012 to 2017.

== Background ==
A major ally of the Assad regime in Syria, Hezbollah assisted the government of Bashar al-Assad throughout the Syrian civil war in its fight against the Syrian opposition since 2011, which Hezbollah has described as a "plot to destroy its alliance with al-Assad against Israel." Hezbollah, an Iranian-backed Shia Islamist militia, was deployed across Syria by 2014, waging a largely sectarian war against the Sunni-dominated opposition forces, including the Free Syrian Army, which saw mass atrocities and war crimes perpetrated against the Syrian Sunni community. Hezbollah has served as a strategic arm of Iran in the Levant, playing a major role in the Iran–Saudi Arabia proxy conflict.

On 8 December 2024, the Assad regime collapsed following the fall of Damascus amid a major offensive by opposition forces led by Hay'at Tahrir al-Sham, which subsequently established a transitional government led by Ahmed al-Sharaa. Hezbollah fighters facilitated the evacuation of senior Assad regime officials and members of the Assad family to Lebanon. Since then, the new Syrian government has taken steps to curb weapons and drug smuggling along the border, after cutting Iran's supply route to Hezbollah through the Iraq–Syria border, hindering Hezbollah's ability to reconstruct after having its military capabilities largely damaged by the Israeli invasion of Lebanon. On 11 January 2025, Syrian head of state Ahmed al-Sharaa met with Lebanese Prime Minister Najib Mikati, reaching an agreement to secure the border between the two countries and prevent illegal smuggling as a top priority.

== Timeline ==
=== December 2024 ===
On 14 December 2024, a raid on Al-Mazra'a in Homs Governorate, regarded as a significant Hezbollah stronghold, was launched by the Syrian Military Operations Command, resulting in the arrests of "dozens of young men accused of committing previous violations against the people of the area". On the same day, Hezbollah Secretary General Naim Qassem declared his intention to establish a working relationship with the new HTS-led interim government to restore its weapons supply route in Syria.

=== January 2025 ===
On 10 January 2025, Hezbollah militants killed five HTS fighters in western Al-Qusayr District and wrote threats to the Syrian state on their corpses. Other sources claim that the five killed were civilians. Al-Qusayr has long served as a key smuggling route for Hezbollah to move weaponry into Lebanon.

On 13 January 2025, it was alleged that Hezbollah was involved in an attack in coordination with the Assadist Syrian Popular Resistance against Syrian government forces, killing over 35 HTS-led forces in western Homs Governorate, as part of the Assad loyalist Western Syria insurgency.

On 25 January 2025, Syrian forces thwarted an attempt to smuggle weapons to Hezbollah from Rif Dimashq Governorate. Syrian government forces seized more small arms destined to Hezbollah from Rif Dimashq and Homs governorates on 2 and 3 February.

=== February 2025 ===
On 6 February 2025, the Syrian Army announced the launching of a security campaign in the western Homs Governorate to "close smuggling routes for weapons and contraband." It subsequently entered Haweek, a border town in the Hermel region in northeastern Lebanon frequently used for smuggling, after repelling Hezbollah's attempt to advance into Al-Qusayr. The clashes involved exchanges of fire and use of mortar shells by the Syrian army. Lebanese clans — reportedly part of a Hezbollah-affiliated smuggling network that formerly cooperated with the Assad regime Captagon smuggling industry — killed two or three Syrian soldiers, formerly members of HTS, and captured two others, publishing a video of them beating beaten and transferring them to Hermel. Syria responded by sending military reinforcements to the area, raiding the town and clashing with Hezbollah-affiliated clans and members of the former Syrian regime, arresting 18 of them. A Syrian shell that landed in the Lebanese border town of al-Qasr wounded a Lebanese Army soldier. The Syrian Ministry of Defense announced that it "extended its control over the town of Haweek" after clashes with Hezbollah and drug trafficking groups, and gave the kidnappers a 6-hour ultimatum to hand over the two kidnapped Syrian soldiers.

On 7 February 2025, clashes between the Syrian Army and Lebanese clan members continued to escalate. Three Lebanese militants were injured in Qanafed located at the border, including two from the Jaafar clan and another belonging to the Rashini clan. Four others were injured by Syrian artillery fire on the Lebanese border village of Jarmash, and two Syrian rockets fell on the outskirts of Kouwakh in Lebanon. On the same day, the Syrian government and Lebanese clans agreed to a prisoner exchange. As part of the agreement, the Lebanese tribesmen released two members of HTS and handed over the body of a dead HTS fighter, and in return HTS released 16 women and children taken from a neighboring village, according to the Hezbollah-aligned Al Mayadeen.

On 8 February 2025, Lebanese President Joseph Aoun ordered units of the Lebanese Army stationed along the northern and eastern borders to "respond to the sources of fire launched from Syrian territory" with the "appropriate weapons." The Lebanese National News Agency stated that the army was deployed to new positions on the outskirts of Hermel, and reported that an army observation tower was damaged by an artillery shell from Syria. It also reported that 8 people were transported to hospitals in Hermel after being injured by shelling targeting the towns of Zakiyah, Ard al-Sabea, Sahlat al-Maa, and Qanafez.

On 9 February 2025, the Lebanese Army announced that it had launched retaliatory strikes against Syrian positions in response to continued shelling of Lebanese border regions from Syria. Extensive security measures were implemented along the border, including monitoring points, patrols, and temporary checkpoints. The Lebanese National News Agency reported that Syrian rockets landed in several villages in eastern Lebanon, and that two Syrian drones were shot down over the border. Lebanese army also began raiding several Hezbollah holdouts in the border regions of northern Lebanon.

On 10 February 2025, the Lebanese Army confiscated a "large quantity" of weapons including "rocket-propelled grenades, hand grenades, military weapons, and ammunition," from the homes of wanted individuals. Syrian authorities reported seizing a large number of drug manufacturing facilities and a counterfeit currency printing press in Haweek. Additionally, Lebanese Shia clans, including the Jaafar, Zaiter, Noun, Jamal, and Rachini families, announced their withdrawal from Syria to Lebanon "to avoid any friction." Shia clans in the northern part of the Beqaa Valley expressed "dismay" at the "total and unjustified abandonment" by the Lebanese state, which they said forced them to defend the country themselves. The Syrian Ministry of Defense deployed additional military reinforcements to the Al-Qusayr countryside in western Homs as it continued to clash with what it called "remnants of the Assad regime and drug traffickers."

On 11 February 2025, Syria announced that it had started planting landmines at illegal border crossings and roads with Lebanon. The Syrian Military Operations Command stated that "After completing the sweeping of the border with Lebanon, we have begun mining all illegal crossings and roads within our borders to prevent smuggling and issues with Lebanon." According to a source, "Lebanese authorities have issued strict directives to secure the border and remove Lebanese militants, which has been carried out."

On 22 February 2025, the Israeli Air Force launched airstrikes against Hezbollah on the border between Syria and Lebanon.

=== March 2025 ===
On March 16, a violent altercation took place between members of Lebanese tribal groups and personnel from the Syrian Ministry of Defence's Luwaa Ali Bin Aby Taleb unit. During this initial encounter, one tribal member reportedly sustained stabbing injuries. Following this, three members of the Luwaa Ali Bin Aby Taleb unit were killed within Lebanese territory by the armed tribal groups in the Jard Al-Harmal region. The tribal groups were reported as potentially belonging to smuggling networks allegedly connected to Hezbollah. The incident occurred near Al-Sad Road, opposite Al-Qasr Village along the Syrian-Lebanese border. According to reporting by the Syrian Observatory for Human Rights (SOHR), Syrian military personnel were allegedly enticed across the border into Lebanese territory, where they were subsequently ambushed. A video taken of the ambush indicated that one victim was fatally attacked with stones. Following the ambush, the tribal members took the remains to the Lebanese Army, who then gave them back to Syria.

Syrian military authorities deployed substantial reinforcements toward the border region adjacent to Lebanon's northern Beqaa Valley, establishing a presence along the border and targeting areas where tribal armed groups were reportedly active. Syrian defense forces concentrated their efforts in the terrain surrounding Jard Al-Harmal, particularly near the Lebanese settlement of Hawik Village.

Intelligence reports indicated military convoys moving from central Syrian positions toward the border zone. Additionally, armed contingents reportedly arrived from Syria's Idlib Governorate and the Ghab Plain, suggesting a coordinated military response by Damascus. The Syrian Ministry of Defense publicly announced through its official news agency SANA its intention to implement "all necessary countermeasures" as a response to what it characterized as "a serious escalation" along its western border with Lebanon. The statement accused the tribe members of being part of a Hezbollah-affiliated militia, and of kidnapping the three Syrian troops from near the Zeita Dam in Homs' western countryside into Lebanon before killing them. Hezbollah formally distanced itself from the conflict, issuing an official statement explicitly denying any role in the ambush, border clashes, or associated military operations.

In response to the mobilization of the Syrian military, the Lebanese Armed Forces dispatched reinforcement units to defend the affected border communities. Lebanese military reconnaissance aircraft have been observed conducting surveillance operations over the border area. The Lebanese military faced direct military attacks, with reports indicating projectiles landing near army positions.

Fighting intensified around the Lebanese town of Qasr in the northern Beqaa Valley. Artillery shells from the Al-Qusayr countryside in Syria struck locations within Lebanese territory, with impacts reportedly from Grad rocket systems being recorded in the Hermel District of Lebanon. Guided missiles targeted vehicles traversing the border region. Mortar rounds and indiscriminate gunfire from Syria struck several Lebanese residential neighborhoods, raising humanitarian concerns due to the great risk of civilian casualties and displacement. On the evening of March 17, 2025, reports indicated a further escalation as gunfire erupted between the Lebanese Armed Forces and the Syrian Army on the outskirts of Hawsh al-Sayyid Ali, near Lebanon's northern border. Syrian forces would capture the border-crossing villages of Hawsh al-Sayyid Ali and Hawch Beit Ismail announcing they would not advance past them. The Iraqi Shiite group, Abbas Shield Martyrdom Forces, self-claimed an attack on the Security Forces, on the border with Lebanon, killing 4 members.

=== March 2026 ===
On March 3, Syria sent troops to its borders with Lebanon, Iraq and Israeli-occupied Golan Heights

On March 6, a soldier from the Lebanese Army was injured by gunfire coming from Syria

On March 10, the Syrian army reported shelling of their positions in Serghaya.

== Impact ==
Humanitarian organizations operating in the region faced severe operational constraints due to the fighting. The risk to aid workers necessitated the suspension of field activities in border-adjacent areas in Lebanon and Syria, restricting the movement of aid and potentially disrupting assistance to vulnerable populations. SARI Global reported that the indiscriminate targeting of Lebanese villages threatened to create new displacement flows, and could further strain humanitarian access to communities in need.

== Analysis ==
Western diplomatic sources noted that Hezbollah's decision to not be officially involved in the conflict "signals a shift in their operational approach," as they currently resort to "acting through local tribes in the region, orchestrating events from behind the scenes" as opposed to how they would have intervened directly in the past. Diplomatic sources also expressed concern that the conflict could adopt a sectarian dimension, given that Lebanese border villages are exclusively Shia while the new Syrian government is largely Sunni and "perceived as linked to Daesh, oppressing a minority."

According to The Arab Weekly, the Lebanese Army's decision to move against Hezbollah signifies that it prioritizes its own agenda regardless of Hezbollah's positions and interests. It also indicates the army's solemnity in implementing the 2024 Israel–Lebanon ceasefire agreement.
