= Tedral =

Medicine for respiratory diseases

Combination of
- Theophylline: phosphodiesterase inhibitor, adenosine receptor antagonist
- Ephedrine: stimulant, sympathomimetic
- Phenobarbital: barbiturate

Clinical data
- Pregnancy category: D

Identifiers
- CAS Number: 8057-98-5
- PubChem CID: 3080648

Tedral, or theophylline/ephedrine/phenobarbital, is a medicine formerly used to treat respiratory diseases such as asthma, chronic obstructive lung disease (COPD), chronic bronchitis, and emphysema. It is a combination drug containing three active ingredients - theophylline, ephedrine, phenobarbital. This medication relaxes the smooth muscle of the airways, making breathing easier. The common side effects of Tedral include gastrointestinal disturbances, dizziness, headache and lightheadedness. However, at high dose, it may lead to cardiac arrhythmias, hypertension, seizures or other serious cardiovascular and/or central nervous system adverse effects. Tedral is contraindicated in individuals with hypersensitivity to theophylline, ephedrine and/or phenobarbital. It should be also used in caution in patients with cardiovascular complications, such as ischemic heart disease and heart failure and/or other disease conditions. It can cause a lot of drug–drug interactions. Therefore, before prescribing patient with Tedral, drug interactions profile should be carefully checked if the patient had other concurrent medication(s). Being used as a treatment option for respiratory diseases for decades, Tedral was withdrawn from the US market in 2006 due to safety concerns.

== Medical uses ==
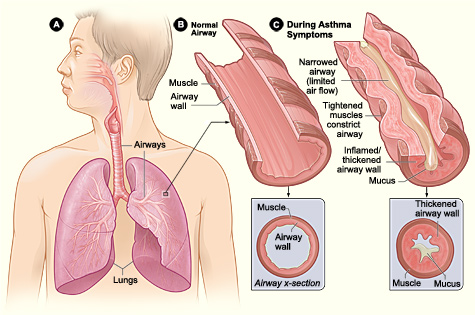
Asthma is a chronic condition that affects the airways in the lungs. The image shows the difference between a healthy bronchial airway (left) and a bronchial airway during an asthma attack (right). Exposure to asthma triggers can lead to inflammation and narrowing of airways in asthma patients, resulting in asthma attacks and breathing difficulties. And Tedral exerts its therapeutic effects by decreasing airway responsiveness to allergens and relaxing the smooth muscle of the airways, thereby, making breathing easier.

Tedral is an oral bronchodilator, which contains three active ingredients, including (1) theophylline, (2) ephedrine, and (3) phenobarbital. It was indicated for the symptomatic relief of asthmatic bronchitis, chronic bronchial asthma, COPD or other bronchospastic disorders. It was usually used as an added-on therapy in asthmatic patients with inadequate symptomatic control even with inhaled bronchodilators or inhaled corticosteroids. Besides, it could also be used as a prophylactic treatment for the prevention of asthmatic attacks.

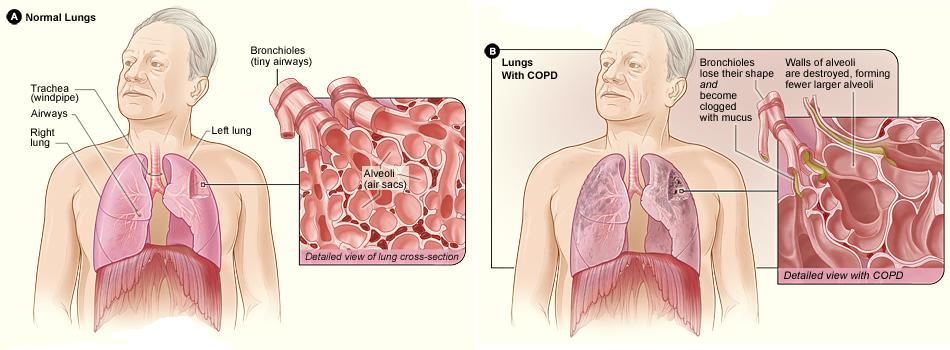
The image above shows the difference between a normal, healthy lung (left) and a COPD patient's lung (right). Chronic obstructive pulmonary disease (COPD), is a progressive lung disease. The term COPD includes two main conditions: (1) emphysema and (2) chronic bronchitis. Emphysema develops when the walls of alveoli are destroyed, forming fewer larger alveoli. Chronic bronchitis is triggered by repeated or constant irritation and inflammation in the lining of airways. Bronchioles thus, lose their shape and become clogged with mucus. These conditions result in difficulty in breathing. Symptoms can be improved by Tedral because of its bronchodilating property.

== Mechanism of action ==
There are three active ingredients in Tedral and they have different mechanisms of action.

=== Theophylline ===
Theophylline

Theophylline relaxes the bronchial smooth muscle and pulmonary artery smooth muscle. In addition, it also reduces the airway responsiveness to allergens, adenosine, methacholine, and histamine by two distinct mechanisms:

First, it acts as a competitive nonselective phosphodiesterase inhibitor to inhibit type III and type IV phosphodiesterase. The inhibition of type III and type IV phosphodiesterase leads to an increase in the concentration of intracellular cAMP, which then activates protein kinase A, and inhibits TNF-alpha, and leukotriene synthesis. Thereby, suppressing inflammation and innate immunity

Second, theophylline is also a nonselective adenosine receptor antagonist, which acts on A1, A2, and A3 receptors with almost the same affinity. This possibly explains theophylline's cardiac effects. Adenosine-mediated channels also enhance diaphragmatic muscle contractility by promoting calcium uptake.

Other mechanisms of action of theophylline have also been proposed. These include the inhibition of nuclear factor-kappaB prevents the translocation of the pro-inflammatory transcription factor (NF-kappaB) to the nucleus, thereby reducing the expression of known inflammatory genes in conditions such as COPD and asthma. Additionally, it increases the secretion of interleukin-10, which has broad anti-inflammatory effects. This process also decreases poly (ADP-ribose) polymerase-1 (PARP-1), promotes apoptosis of inflammatory cells, including T cells and neutrophils, and increases levels of histone deacetylase 2 by inhibiting phosphoinositide 3-kinase-delta.

=== Ephedrine ===
Ephedrine

Ephedrine, a stereoisomer of pseudoephedrine, acts as a direct and indirect sympathomimetic amine. Its indirect mechanism makes it more unique than other sympathomimetic agents, for example, pseudoephedrine and phenylephrine.

It directly binds to both alpha and beta receptors. However, its primary mechanism of action is indirectly achieved by the inhibition of neuronal norepinephrine reuptake and displacement of more norepinephrine from storage vesicles. These actions prolong the presence of norepinephrine in the synapse for binding to postsynaptic alpha and beta receptors. Thereby, leading to alpha- and beta-adrenergic stimulation.

The stimulation of alpha-1-adrenergic receptors in vascular smooth muscle cells leads to an increase in systemic vascular resistance and, thus, systolic and diastolic blood pressure. Direct stimulation of beta-1 receptors by ephedrine and norepinephrine also increases cardiac chronotropy and inotropy. Lastly, stimulation of beta-2-adrenergic receptors in the lungs results in bronchodilation, however, the effect is less significant than those seen in the cardiovascular system.

=== Phenobarbital ===
Phenobarbital

Phenobarbital prolongs the time that chloride channels are open. Thereby, depressing the central nervous system. This is accomplished by acting on GABA-A receptor subunits. When phenobarbital binds to these receptors, the chloride ion gates open and remain open, allowing these ions to enter neuronal cells steadily. This action causes the cell membrane to hyperpolarize, leading to a raise in the action potential threshold.

== Adverse effects ==
=== Theophylline ===
Due to the presence of theophylline in Tedral, the most common side effects of this drug include:

- Gastrointestinal: nausea and vomiting, increased stomach acid secretion, and gastroesophageal reflux. These could be due to the inhibition of phosphodiesterase;
- Central nervous system: headache, lightheadedness, dizziness, insomnia, restlessness, and irritability.

However, at high serum concentrations, some serious adverse effects may occur:

- Cardiovascular: convulsions, cardiac arrhythmias. These could be to adenosine A1-receptor antagonism
- Central nervous system: seizures, non-convulsive status epilepticus

Other adverse side effects include:

- Neuromuscular and skeletal: tremor
- Genitourinary: difficulty in micturition in males with prostatism, transient diuresis
- Endocrine and metabolic: hypercalcemia in patients with concomitant hyperthyroid disease

=== Ephedrine ===
Ephedrine has both alpha- and beta-agonist effects. Owing to its sympathomimetic effect, the common side effects of Tedral include:

- Gastrointestinal: nausea, vomiting
- Cardiovascular: tachycardia, hypertension, irregular pulse, palpitations, bradycardia
- Central nervous system: dizziness, anxiety, restlessness, and insomnia

Besides, ephedrine can cause cardiac arrhythmias. When ephedrine is used in long-term, the catecholamine excess can bring about contraction band necrosis of the myocardium, which predisposes the heart to ventricular arrhythmias.

=== Phenobarbital ===
Phenobarbital also results in the adverse effects of Tedral. The most common side effects caused by phenobarbital are dizziness, sedation, incoordination, and impaired balance. However, these adverse effects affect geriatric patients to a greater extent.

Concerning the adverse effects of phenobarbital after long-term usage, loss of appetite, depression, irritability, achiness in the bones, joints, or muscles, and liver damage may occur.

Other reported adverse reactions include:

- Cardiovascular: hypotension, bradycardia, syncope
- Central nervous system: confusion, agitation, somnolence, ataxia, hyperkinesia, hallucinations, anxiety, nightmares, thinking abnormality, psychiatric disturbance
- Respiratory: hypoventilation, apnea
- Gastrointestinal: nausea, vomiting, constipation
- Dermatologic reactions: exfoliative dermatitis, toxic epidermic necrolysis, Stevens-Johnson syndrome (rare)

== Contraindications ==
=== Theophylline ===
Because one of the active ingredients in Tedral is theophylline, Tedral is contraindicated if the patient has:

- Hypersensitivity to xanthine derivatives
- Coronary artery disease (cardiac stimulating effects of Theophylline may prove harmful)
- Peptic ulcer
- Concomitant use with ephedrine in children.

=== Ephedrine ===
Because Tedral also contains Ephedrine, Tedral is contraindicated for patients who have:

- Acute hypertension
- Tachycardia

Ephedrine raises both chronotropy and inotropy, increasing myocardial oxygen demand. Therefore, it has to be used in caution in patients with ischemic heart disease or heart failure. It should also be avoided in situations where tachycardia would be undesirable, for example aortic stenosis.

Ephedrine's alpha-adrenergic stimulation causes contraction of the smooth muscle at the base of the bladder, resulting in resistance to urine output. It is, therefore, the use of Tedral in patients with urinary retention and prostatic hyperplasia has to be cautious.

In addition, due to excessive norepinephrine availability at the synapse, which could induce a hypertensive crisis via the indirect sympathomimetic effect of ephedrine, Tedral should be avoided or used with caution within 14 days of monoamine oxidase inhibitor (MAOI) therapy.

=== Phenobarbital ===
Tedral is also composed of phenobarbital, therefore, it is contraindicated for individuals with:

- Hypersensitivity to phenobarbital, barbiturates or any component of the formulation.
- A history/manifest or latent porphyria
- Liver impairment
- Nephritic syndrome (at high dose)
- A history of sedative-hypnotic drug addiction

== Drug interactions ==
=== Theophylline ===
Due to the presence of theophylline, Tedral interacts with:

- Adenosine
- Allopurinol
- Alcohol
- Anti-psychotic agents
- Antithyroid agents
- Barbiturates
- Benzodiazepines
- Bupropion
- Beta-2 agonists
- Beta blockers
- CYP1A2 inhibitors
- CYP1A2 inducers
- Cambendazole
- Clarithromycin
- Erythromycin
- Interleukin-6 (IL-6) inhibiting therapies
- Iohexol
- Levothyroxine
- Methotrexate
- Quinine
- Verapamil
- Zafirlukast

Theophylline cause interactions of Tedral with the following diseases:

- Peptic ulcer disease (PUD)
- Renal dysfunction
- Seizure disorders

=== Ephedrine ===
Because of the presence of ephedrine, Tedral interacts with:

- Alkalinizing agents
- Alpha-1 blockers
- Beta blockers
- Cannabinoid-containing products
- Carbonic anhydrase inhibitors
- Clonidine
- Clozapine
- Inhalation Anesthetics
- Iobenguane radiopharmaceutical products
- Monoamine oxidase inhibitors
- Quinidine
- Serotonin / norepinephrine reuptake inhibitors
- Sympathomimetics
- Tricyclic antidepressants
- Urinary acidifying agents

Since ephedrine is one of the active ingredients in Tedral, Tedral interacts with the following disease:

- Cardiovascular disease
- Benign prostatic hyperplasia (BPH)
- Diabetes

=== Phenobarbital ===
Since Tedral contains phenobarbital, it interacts with:

- Acetaminophen
- Blood pressure lowering agents
- Cannabinoid-containing products
- CNS depressants
- Doxycycline
- Local anesthetics
- Magnesium Sulfate
- Procarbazine
- Quinine

With phenobarbital being one of the active ingredients in Tedral, Tedral interacts with the following disease:

- Acute alcohol intoxication
- Drug dependence
- Liver disease
- Porphyria
- Rash
- Respiratory depression
- Cardiovascular
- Prolonged hypotension
- Renal dysfunction

== History ==
The history of Tedral can be traced back to the early 20th century when theophylline was first isolated from tea leaves and later found to have bronchodilator properties. In the 1920s and 1930s, ephedrine was introduced as a treatment for asthma and other respiratory conditions due to its bronchodilating effect and ability to increase blood flow to the lungs.

The combination of theophylline and ephedrine was first used in the 1940s as a treatment for asthma, and the addition of a barbiturate such as pentobarbital or phenobarbital was later added to enhance the sedative effects of the medication and improve patient compliance.

Tedral was first marketed by the pharmaceutical company Eli Lilly and Company in the 1950s as a treatment for asthma and other respiratory conditions, and later sold to Novartis Pharmaceuticals Corporation. It was widely used throughout the 1960s and 1970s, but its popularity declined in the 1980s due to the development of newer, more effective medications for asthma and COPD, such as inhaled corticosteroids, long-acting beta-agonists, leukotriene modifiers and immunomodulators.

Tedral was withdrawn from the US market in 2006 due to safety concerns related to the use of ephedrine. The US Food and Drug Administration (FDA) had previously issued warnings about the use of ephedrine-containing products due to their potential for serious side effects, including heart attack, stroke, and death. In response, many pharmaceutical companies voluntarily removed their ephedrine-containing products from the market. In the case of Tedral, its manufacturer, Novartis Pharmaceuticals Corporation, voluntarily withdrew the medication from the market in 2006 after the FDA issued a warning letter to the company citing safety concerns related to the use of ephedrine.

== See also ==
- Theophylline/ephedrine
