= Hezbollah–Syria relations =

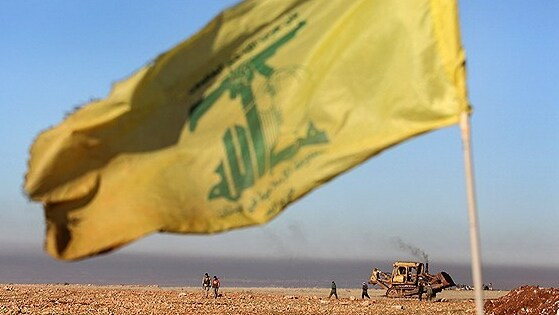
Hezbollah flag flying in Aleppo during the Syrian civil war

Hezbollah–Syria relations have been a crucial aspect of Middle Eastern geopolitics, particularly since the onset of the Syrian civil war. Hezbollah played a substantial role in bolstering the Assad regime against Syrian opposition forces throughout the Syrian civil war since 2011. Hezbollah, an Iranian-backed Shia Islamist political party and militant group based in Lebanon, established itself as a significant force in Syria with both military and political power, waging a largely sectarian war against the Sunni-dominated Syrian rebel forces. In 2023, the attempts by the UAE and Saudi Arabia to rebuild ties with the Syrian regime of Bashar al-Assad was met with concerns by Hezbollah. The Syrian regime was willing to explore possibilities for new alliances.

However, with the fall of the Assad regime in late 2024 as a result of a renewed rebel offensive, Hezbollah found itself increasingly isolated as the newly formed Syrian transitional government sought to curb Iranian weapon transfers to Hezbollah and drug smuggling along the Lebanon–Syria border, culminating in border clashes between both sides.

== Background ==
=== The Axis of Resistance ===
The Axis of Resistance refers to an alliance led by Iran, which includes state and non-state actors that aim to counter Western influence in the Middle East, particularly that of the United States and Israel. Core members of this alliance are the Assad regime in Syria and Lebanese Hezbollah. Iran has also extended its influence to Iraqi Shia militants. Central to the alliance is mutual support, including financial, logistical, and military assistance, with Syria serving as a vital conduit for Iranian aid to Hezbollah.

Iran's financial support to Hezbollah amounts to an estimated $200 million annually. After the 2006 conflict with Israel, both Iran and Syria played pivotal roles in rearming Hezbollah with more sophisticated weapons. The war in Syria has threatened this strategic alliance by endangering one of its primary members, making it a significant concern for Iran and Hezbollah. The preservation of the Axis of Resistance is not only strategic but also ideological, as it encompasses Iran's aim of exporting its Islamic revolutionary ideals.

== Hezbollah's involvement in Syria ==
=== Early operations: 2011–2013 ===
Initially, Hezbollah's activities in Syria were limited and clandestine. The group's operations were designed to support the Assad regime without drawing significant international attention. During this period, Hezbollah's involvement was mainly in an advisory and logistical capacity, providing strategic planning and training to Syrian government forces.

=== Escalation and public acknowledgment: 2013–2024 ===
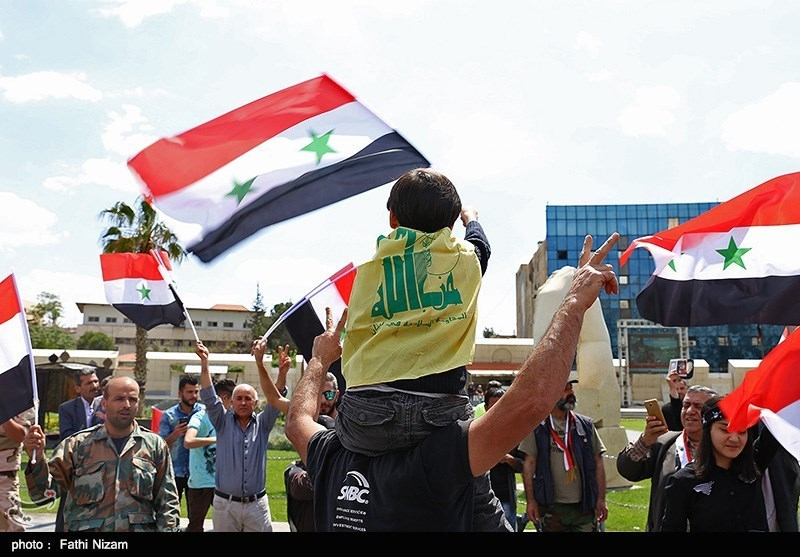
Pro-government Syrians demonstration in Damascus after Internal missile strikes, with flags of Syria and Hezbollah, 2018.

The year 2013 marked a turning point as Hezbollah publicly acknowledged its presence in Syria and increased its commitment on the ground. Hezbollah fighters, alongside Syrian and Iraqi forces, engaged in significant operations to regain control of rebel-held territories. This active participation enabled the Assad regime to reclaim areas and improve its military effectiveness.

The presence of Hezbollah in Syria has had profound implications on the battlefield, shifting momentum in favor of pro-regime forces. It has also exacerbated sectarian tensions within Lebanon and contributed to regional instability.

=== Collapse of the Assad regime: 2024–present ===
On 8 December 2024, the Assad regime collapsed as a result of the fall of Damacus amid a major offensive by opposition forces led by Hay'at Tahrir al-Sham, which subsequently established a transitional government led by Ahmed al-Sharaa. Since then, the new Syrian government has taken steps to curb weapons and drug smuggling along the border, after cutting Iran's supply route to Hezbollah through the Iraq–Syria border, hindering Hezbollah's ability to reconstruct after having its military capabilities largely damaged by the Israeli invasion of Lebanon.

== Size, scope, and structure ==
The scale of Hezbollah's involvement in Syria is substantial, with a well-organized structure that has integrated seamlessly with Syrian and Iranian forces. The group's operations have spanned across Syria, indicating a strategic approach to their military engagement. Hezbollah's commitment of resources and fighters indicates the high level of importance placed on the survival of the Assad regime and the maintenance of the Axis of Resistance.

== Implications ==
=== Impact on Lebanon ===
Hezbollah's deepened involvement in Syria has heightened sectarian tensions within Lebanon, compromising its internal security and political stability. The group's actions in Syria have also invited criticism from various factions within Lebanon, who see Hezbollah's priorities aligned more with Iranian interests than with those of the Lebanese state.

=== Regional consequences ===
Hezbollah's role in Syria has had significant ramifications for regional security. The group's military prowess and strategic operations in Syria have reinforced its status as a formidable force, one that operates beyond the borders of Lebanon. Hezbollah's involvement has also underscored the complexities of proxy warfare in the Middle East, with various regional and international actors vying for influence.

== See also ==
- Foreign relations of Hezbollah
