= Illegal drug trade in Syria =

The illegal drug trade in Syria has been a significant issue, particularly during the civil war and under the regime of former President Bashar al-Assad. The country became the largest producer and exporter of Captagon, an amphetamine-type stimulant, in the world leading some analysts to label Syria as a "narco-state".

== Background ==
During the Syrian civil war, the Assad regime began mass production of drugs within Syria, and officers fed their men fenethylline, which they called "Captain Courage." Several shipments containing tonnes of amphetamines were seized in different countries smuggled from Syria. After 2013, Captagon production and export in Syria skyrocketed, with the direct support of the Assad regime, and its multi-billion dollar profits exceeded the total GDP. By 2020, Syria had become the world's biggest center of Captagon production, sales and exports.

== Production and distribution ==
The production of Captagon in Syria was reportedly overseen by high-ranking officials within the Assad regime, including Maher al-Assad, the president's brother and commander of the Fourth Armoured Division. The drug was manufactured in industrial-scale facilities, some located in government-controlled areas such as the Mezzeh air base and a factory in Douma. Its revenues from Captagon smuggling alone is estimated to worth 57 billion dollars annually in 2022, which is approximately thrice the total trade of all Mexican cartels.

Captagon was smuggled across borders into neighboring countries, including Lebanon, Jordan, and Iraq, primarily targeting markets in Gulf nations like Saudi Arabia and the UAE. Smugglers employed various methods to conceal the drugs, such as hiding pills in fake fruits and other objects. The port of Latakia became a focal point for these smuggling activities, attracting scrutiny from international law enforcement agencies.

== Investigations ==
A joint investigation conducted by Organized Crime and Corruption Reporting Project and BBC News Arabic published a documentary in June 2023, revealing further details about the activities of regime officials, Ba'athist military commanders and Assad family members in their involvement in Syria's drug cartel. The investigation found that Lebanese criminal and drug kingpin Hassan Daqou collaborated with Syria's Fourth Armoured Division on trafficiking billions of dollars of drugs, under the command of General Ghassan Bilal, the right-hand man of Maher al-Assad. The report also unearthed Hezbollah's close participation in the drug production and smuggling networks. The Fourth Armoured Division, being an elite military unit permitted to move freely across Assad regime's checkpoints, oversees the smuggling operations from Syria, including the trafficking of cash, weapons, illegal drugs, etc. Days after the publication of the joint BBC-OCCRP documentary; Assad government banned all activities of BBC media outlets and entry of affiliated media personnel in Syria.

== Current situation ==
After the fall of the Assad regime, Syria's new authorities, led by President Ahmed al-Sharaa, have targeted the corporate empires of Assad's allies to root out corruption and illegal drug production. Efforts are underway to reconstruct the country and dismantle the corrupt economic system that facilitated the drug trade. However, challenges remain, including severe economic shortages and the need for cooperation from former regime-linked businessmen

== International reactions ==
The international community responded to Syria's drug trade with sanctions and law enforcement actions. In March 2023, the U.S. Department of the Treasury sanctioned individuals and entities supporting the Assad regime through illicit financial transfers and drug trafficking. These measures aimed to disrupt the production and export of Captagon and other illegal substances.

== See also ==
- Ba'athist Syrian Captagon industry
