= Bamifylline =

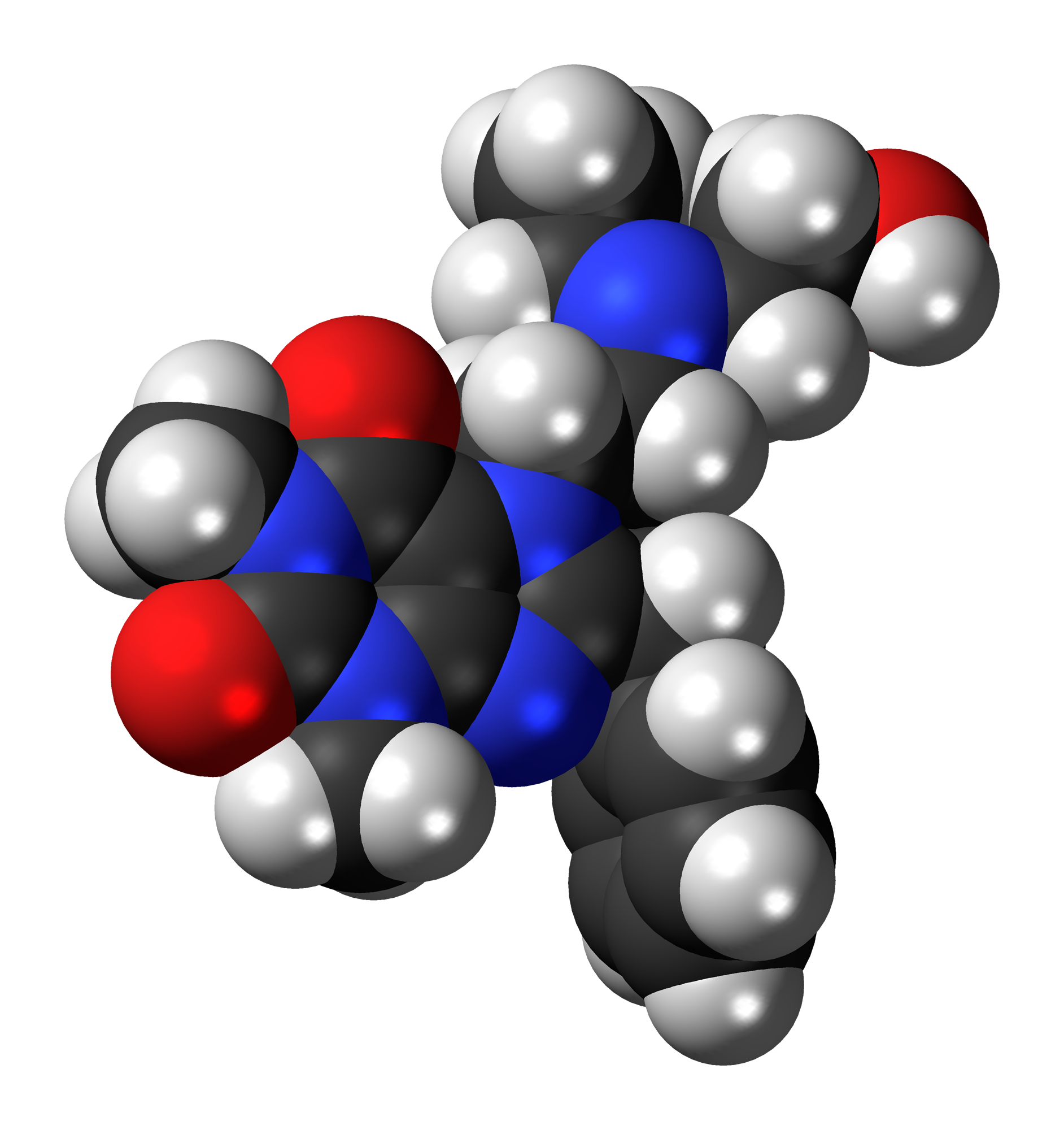

Names
- Preferred IUPAC name 8-Benzyl-7-{2-[ethyl(2-hydroxyethyl)amino]ethyl}-1,3-dimethyl-3,7-dihydro-1H-purine-2,6-dione

Identifiers
CAS Number	2016-63-9
3D model (JSmol)	Interactive image
ChEMBL	ChEMBL2110760
ChemSpider	15401
ECHA InfoCard	100.116.522
PubChem CID	16229
UNII	ZTY15D026H
CompTox Dashboard (EPA)	DTXSID0022642
- InChI: InChI=1S/C20H27N5O3/c1-4-24(12-13-26)10-11-25-16(14-15-8-6-5-7-9-15)21-18-17(25)19(27)23(3)20(28)22(18)2/h5-9,26H,4,10-14H2,1-3H3 Key: VVUYEFBRTFASAH-UHFFFAOYSA-N
- SMILES: O=C2N(c1nc(n(c1C(=O)N2C)CCN(CC)CCO)Cc3ccccc3)C

Properties
Chemical formula	C_{20}H_{27}N_{5}O_{3}
Molar mass	385.46008

Pharmacology
ATC code	R03DA08 (WHO)
- Except where otherwise noted, data are given for materials in their standard state (at 25 °C [77 °F], 100 kPa). verify (what is ?) Infobox references

Bamifylline is a drug of the xanthine chemical class which acts as a selective adenosine A_{1} receptor antagonist.

== See also ==
- Theophylline
- Caffeine
