= Theophylline/ephedra/hydroxyzine =

Drug used for treatment of asthma

Combination of
- Theophylline: Stimulant
- Ephedra (medicine): Stimulant
- Hydroxyzine: Antihistamine

Clinical data
- Trade names: Marax
- AHFS/Drugs.com: Micromedex Detailed Consumer Information
- Routes of administration: By mouth
- ATC code: R03DA74 (WHO)

Identifiers
- CAS Number: 64095-02-9
- PubChem SID: 135272520

Theophylline/ephedra/hydroxyzine (trade name Marax) is a drug that was used for the treatment of asthma. It was a combination of theophylline, ephedra, and hydroxyzine, and taken by mouth. It is no longer manufactured in the US due to approval of ephedra being withdrawn by the FDA.

== See also ==
- Theophylline/ephedrine
