= C22H32N4O4 =

The molecular formula C_{22}H_{32}N_{4}O_{4} may refer to:

- Distigmine
- Tonapofylline
