= Lebanon–Syria border =

International border

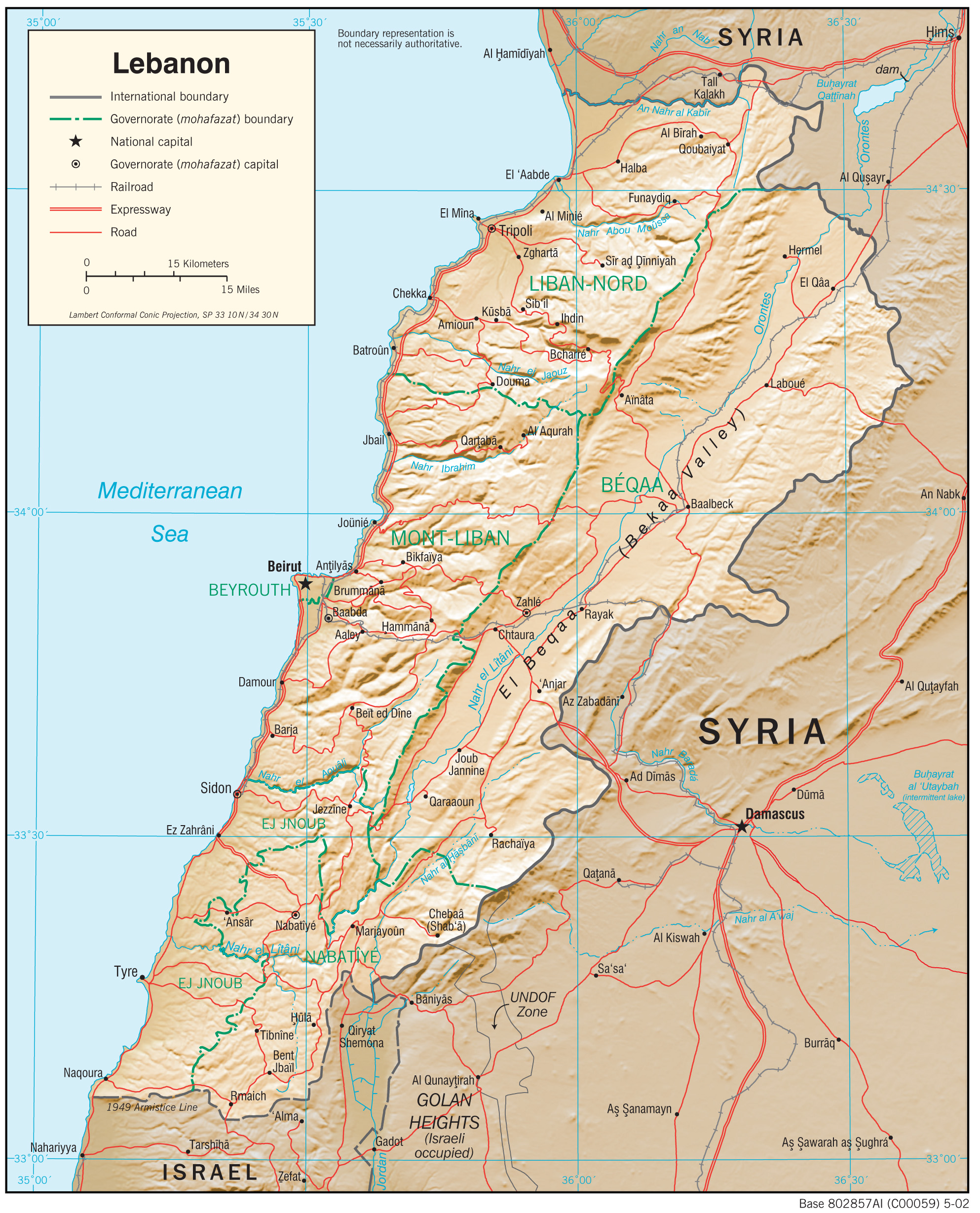
Map of Lebanon

The Lebanon–Syria border is 394 km (245 miles) in length and runs from the Mediterranean coast in the north to the tripoint with Israel in the south.

== Description ==
The border starts at confluence of the Nahr al-Kabir river with the Mediterranean Sea, and then follows this river eastwards some distance inland. The Lebanese border forms a salient to include the villages of Karha and Knaisse Akkar in the north-east of Akkar District, just west of the Syrian Lake Homs, before turning to the south-east via a series of irregular lines, cutting across the Orontes (at 34.455°N 36.490°E) and the trans-Beqaa road between Qaa and Al-Qusayr (at 34.4217°N 36.5433°E), reaching the Anti-Lebanon Mountains at about 34.22°N 36.60°E. The border then turns towards the south-west, generally following the Anti-Lebanon Mountains via a series of irregular lines, until reaching Mount Hermon.

The precise location of the Lebanese–Israeli–Syrian tripoint is unclear due to Israel's occupation of the Golan Heights stemming from the 1967 Six-Day War. The de jure tripoint lies on the Hasbani River, a tributary of the river Jordan, at 33.2422°N 35.6244°E, just north-east of the Israeli town of Ma'ayan Baruch. The de facto tripoints lie on the tripoint(s) with the United Nations UNDOF Zone. The situation is further complicated by the dispute over the Shebaa farms area on the Golan-Lebanon border.

== History ==
French Mandate for Syria and the Lebanon, with Greater Lebanon in green

At the beginning of the 20th century what are now Lebanon and Syria belonged to the Ottoman Empire, with the Mount Lebanon semi-autonomous as the Mount Lebanon Mutasarrifate. During the First World War an Arab Revolt, supported by Britain, succeeded in removing the Ottomans from most of the Middle East. However, as a result of the secret 1916 Anglo-French Sykes-Picot Agreement Britain and France split the Ottoman domains between them, with Syria and Lebanon falling under a French mandate.

In 1920 France split its mandate into several political entities, one of which was an expanded Mount Lebanon Mutasarrifate referred to as 'Greater Lebanon', set up chiefly so as to provide a national polity for the generally pro-French Maronite Christians. The process leading to the precise delineation of the frontier is unclear, though it appears to have been based on a map stemming from the 1860s French expedition to the region which was championed by Lebanese nationalist Bulus Nujaym. Many Syrian nationalists opposed the new entity, seeing Lebanon as an integral part of the region of Syria. The remaining Syrian states were eventually merged into one Syrian polity in 1930s, minus Lebanon (and also Hatay, which became part of the new Republic of Turkey). Both Lebanon and Syria gained full independence in the period 1943–1946.

Relations between the two new states were often tense, and a precise border has never been fixed officially with any precision, in spite of Lebanese demands to this effect and some preliminary conducted in the 1950–1960s. Many Lebanese feared that its larger neighbour harboured designs to annex the country. In 1975 long-standing sectarian tensions within Lebanon erupted into civil war, prompting Syria to occupy the country the following year; Syrian troops were to remain in Lebanon until 2005. Since 2011, the border region has been seriously affected by the spillover from the Syrian Civil War.

On 17 March, 2026, the official Syria news agency SANA reported that Syrian forces discovered a two smuggling tunnel leading to the Lebanese side of the border, an area controlled by Hezbollah. The two tunnel that were discovered within 24 hour, were located near the Syrian village of Hosh al-Sayyid Ali, and later sealed.

== Border crossings ==
- Arida Border Crossing
- Jusiyah al-Amar-Qaa Border Crossing
- Masnaa Border Crossing, on the road between Damascus and Beirut
- Dabousieh Border Crossing
- Talkalakh Border Crossing
- Zemrani Border Crossing
- Hamra Border Crossing

== See also ==
- Lebanon–Syria border clashes
- Lebanon–Syria relations
- Syrian Civil War spillover in Lebanon
