= Theodrenaline =

Chemical compound used as a cardiac stimulant

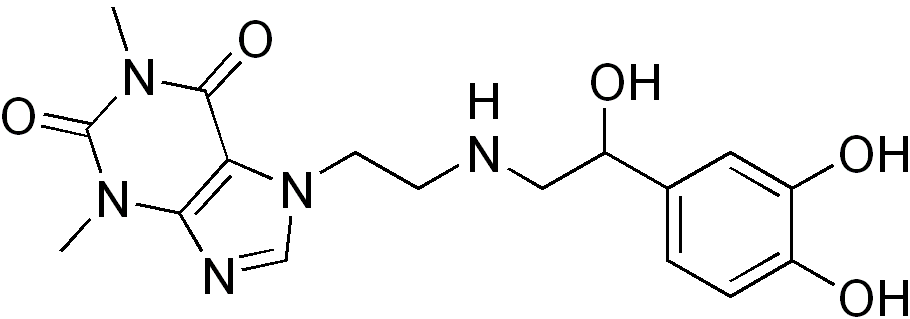

Clinical data
- Other names: Noradrenalinoethyltheophylline; Noradrenaline theophylline
- ATC code: C01CA23 (WHO)

Identifiers
- IUPAC name: (RS)-7-(2-{[2-(3,4-dihydroxyphenyl)-2-hydroxyethyl]amino}ethyl)-1,3-dimethyl-3,7-dihydro-1H-purine-2,6-dione
- CAS Number: 13460-98-5
- PubChem CID: 71857
- DrugBank: DB12927
- ChemSpider: 64874
- UNII: RW8PD99T8G
- KEGG: D07155
- ChEBI: CHEBI:135580
- ChEMBL: ChEMBL2107608
- CompTox Dashboard (EPA): DTXSID40864406

Chemical and physical data
- Formula: C_{17}H_{21}N_{5}O_{5}
- Molar mass: 375.385 g·mol^{−1}
- 3D model (JSmol): Interactive image
- SMILES: Cn1c2c(c(=O)n(c1=O)C)n(cn2)CCNCC(c3ccc(c(c3)O)O)O
- InChI: InChI=1S/C17H21N5O5/c1-20-15-14(16(26)21(2)17(20)27)22(9-19-15)6-5-18-8-13(25)10-3-4-11(23)12(24)7-10/h3-4,7,9,13,18,23-25H,5-6,8H2,1-2H3; Key:WMCMJIGLYZDKRN-UHFFFAOYSA-N

Theodrenaline (INN), also known as noradrenalinoethyltheophylline or as noradrenaline theophylline, is a chemical linkage of norepinephrine (noradrenaline) and theophylline used as a cardiac stimulant. It is sometimes combined with cafedrine.

== See also ==
- Cafedrine
- Fenethylline
- Theophylline ephedrine
