= Nahr al-Kabir =

River in Syria and Lebanon

Coordinates: 34°38′02″N 35°58′32″E

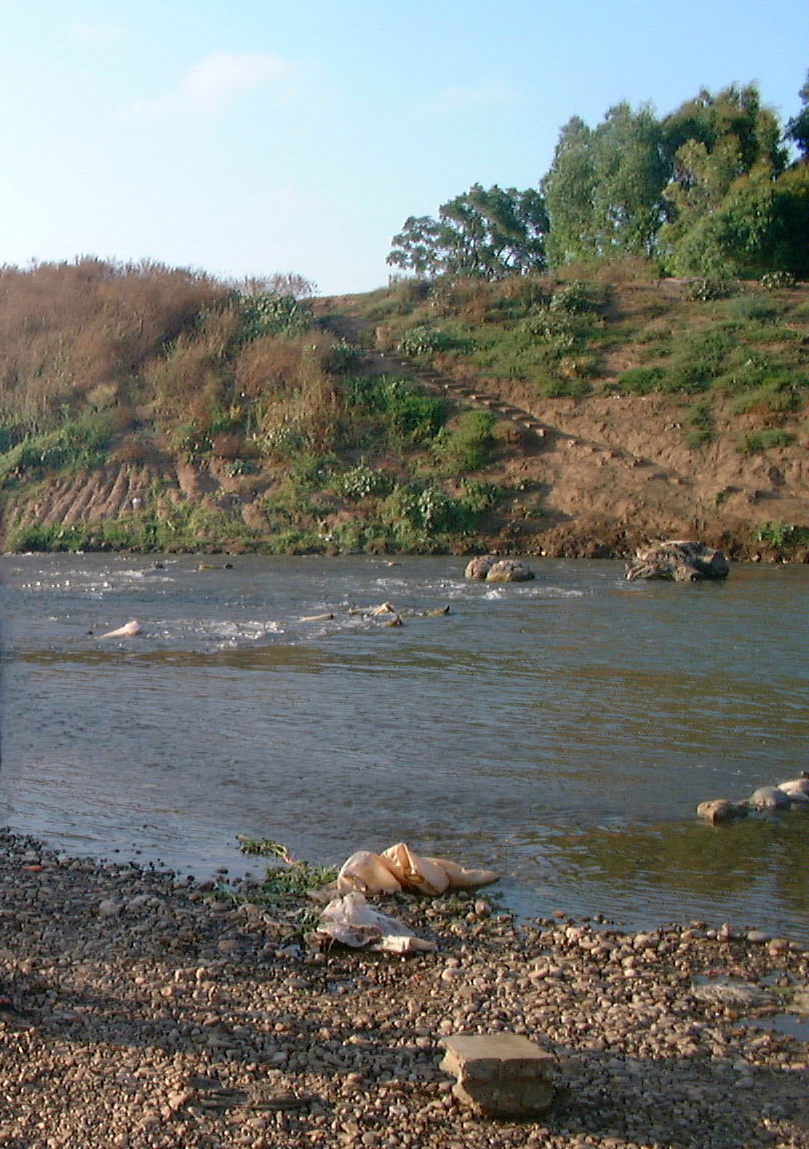
The river in 2005

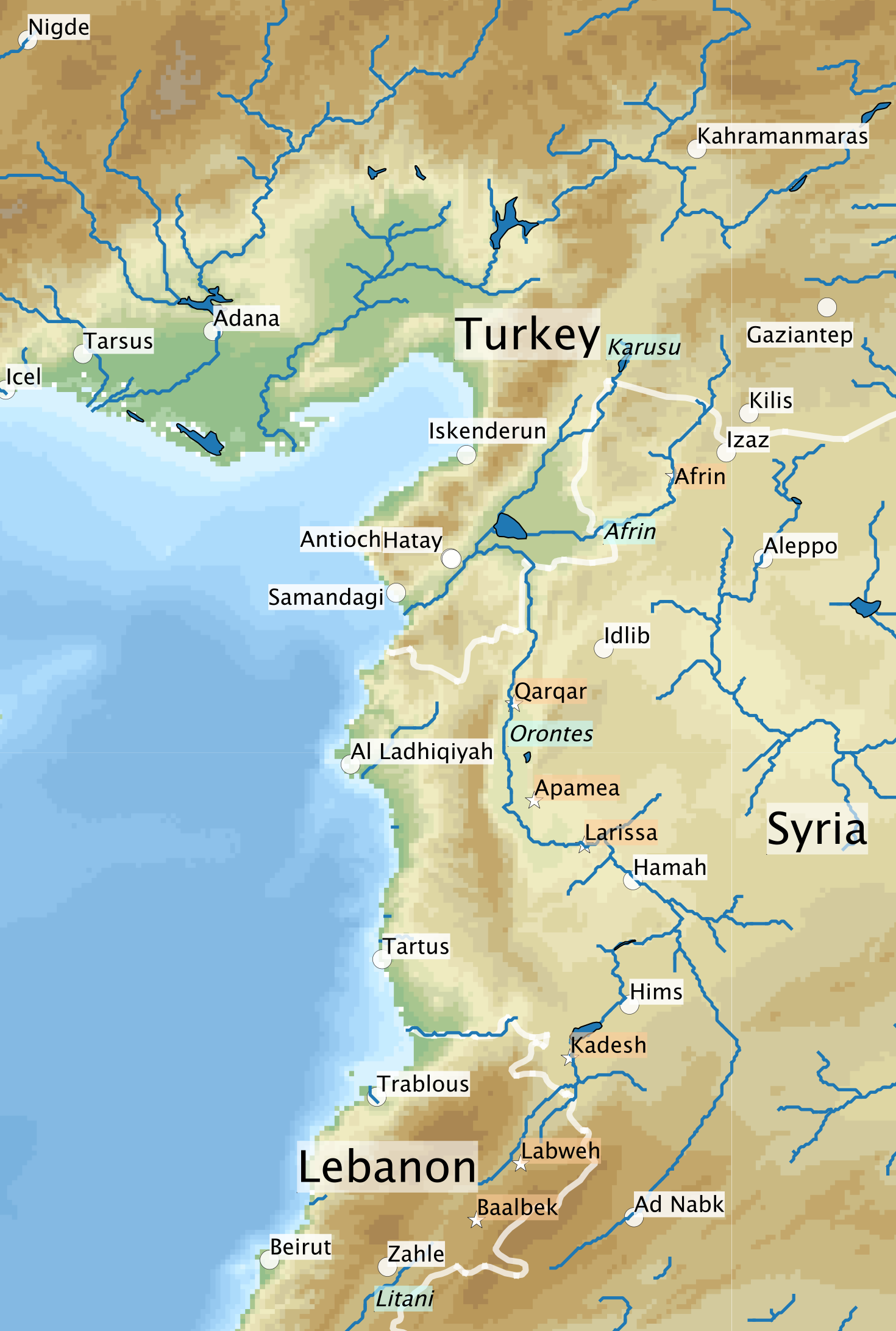
Map of the Northern Levant. Blue lines are rivers, white lines are country borders. Nahr al-Kabir is the relatively short river that forms a part of the Lebanon–Syria border, flowing into the Mediterranean Sea roughly between the cities of Trablous (Tripoli) and Tartus

The Nahr al-Kabir, also known in Syria as al-Nahr al-Kabir al-Janoubi (Arabic: النهر الكبير الجنوبي, romanized: an-Nahr al-Kabīr al-Janūbī, lit. 'the southern great river', in contrast with the Nahr al-Kabir al-Shamali) or in Lebanon simply as the Kebir, is a river in Syria and Lebanon flowing into the Mediterranean Sea at Arida. The river is 77.8 km (48.3 mi) long, and drains a watershed of 954 km^{2} (368 mi^{2}). Its headwaters are at the Ain as-Safa spring in Lebanon and it flows through the Homs Gap in the Orontes River Valley of southern Syria.

The river forms the northern part of the Lebanon–Syria border at the Jebel Ansariyah mountains in Syria. In antiquity, the river was known as Eleutherus (Greek Ελεύθερος Eleutheros, Ελευθερίς Eleuteris lit. 'free'). It defined the border between the Seleucid and Ptolemaic empires during much of the 3rd century BCE.

The river is mentioned by Josephus and in 1 Maccabees 11:7 and 12:30.

Due to its shallowness, the river was a key site of the Syrian refugee crisis since 2011. It was a location for people smuggling and drug (especially captagon) trafficking. It flooded in 2019, inundating Lebanon’s largest Syrian refugee camp. Later, many Syrians returned across the river fleeing the Israel–Hezbollah conflict (2023–2024). River crossings were bombed by Israel in November 2024. After the fall of the Assad regime in December 2024, thousands crossed it irregularly to return to or informally visit Syria. Thousands of refugees fled across the river into Lebanon during the 2025 massacres of Syrian Alawites.
