= Cafedrine =

Chemical linkage of norephedrine and theophylline

Clinical data
- Trade names: Akrinor, Bifort, Praxinor
- Other names: Caphedrine; Cafedrin; Cafedrinum; Caphedrin; Kafedrin; Norephedrino-ethyltheophylline; 7-(2-(β-Hydroxy-α-methylphen-ethylamino)ethyl)theophylline; Norephendrinetheophylline; Ethyltheophyllinylnorephedrine
- ATC code: C01CA21 (WHO)

Identifiers
- IUPAC name: (RS)-7-[2-[(1-hydroxy-1-phenylpropan-2-yl)amino]ethyl]-1,3-dimethylpurine-2,6-dione
- CAS Number: 58166-83-9
- PubChem CID: 5489638
- ChemSpider: 4590188
- UNII: 0UYY5V4U2Q
- ChEMBL: ChEMBL2104207

Chemical and physical data
- Formula: C_{18}H_{23}N_{5}O_{3}
- Molar mass: 357.414 g·mol^{−1}
- 3D model (JSmol): Interactive image
- SMILES: C(CN[C@H]([C@H](O)C1=CC=CC=C1)C)N2C3=C(N(C)C(=O)N(C)C3=O)N=C2
- InChI: InChI=1S/C18H23N5O3/c1-12(15(24)13-7-5-4-6-8-13)19-9-10-23-11-20-16-14(23)17(25)22(3)18(26)21(16)2/h4-8,11-12,15,19,24H,9-10H2,1-3H3/t12-,15-/m0/s1; Key:UJSKUDDDPKGBJY-WFASDCNBSA-N

Cafedrine (INN, BAN), sold under the brand name Akrinor among others, is a chemical linkage of norephedrine and theophylline and is a cardiac stimulant and antihypotensive agent used to increase blood pressure in people with hypotension. It has been marketed in Europe, South Africa, and Indonesia.

There has been concern about cafedrine as a potential performance-enhancing drug and doping agent in sports.

== See also ==
- Fenethylline
- Theodrenaline
- Theophylline ephedrine
