= Homs Gap =

- فتحة حمص
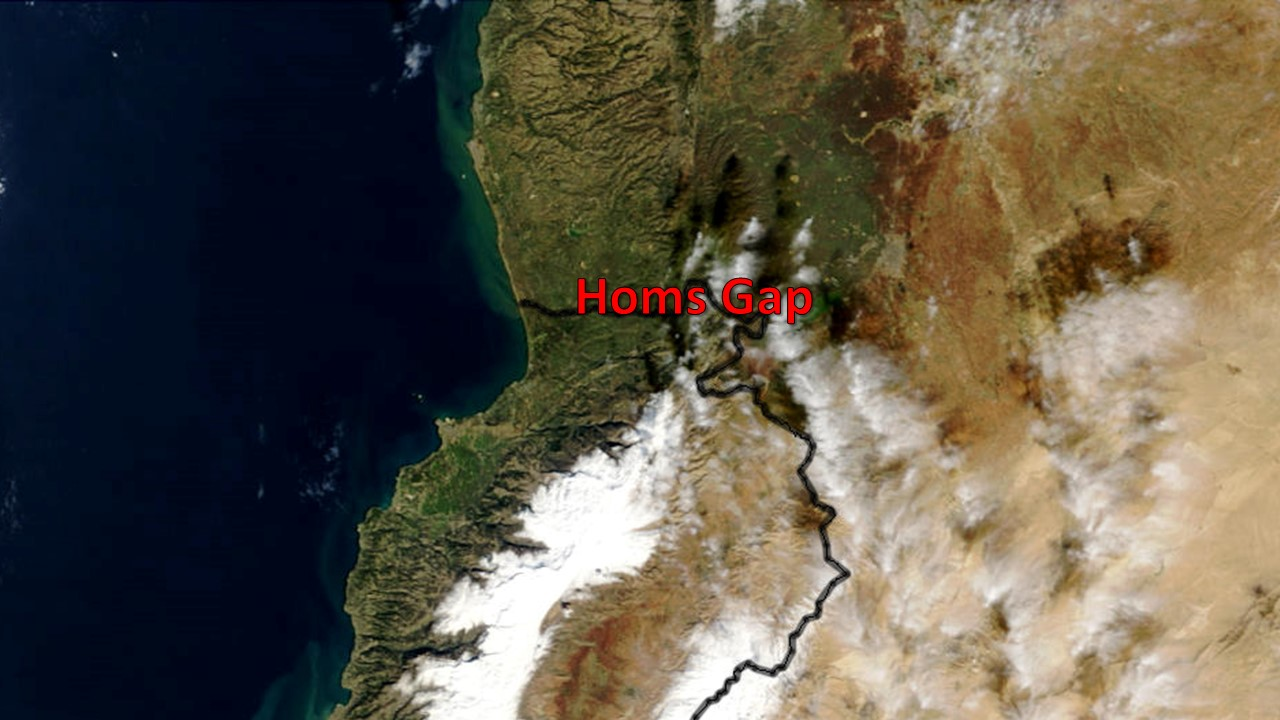
- Interactive map of Homs Gap

Third Approach
- Location: Homs Governorate, Syria
- Range: Al-Ansariyah mountains, Anti-Lebanon Mountains
- Coordinates: 34.7°N 36.343°E

The Homs Gap (Arabic: فتحة حمص) (also called the Akkar Gap and known in Arabic as al-Buqay'a) is a relatively flat passage in the Orontes River Valley of southern Syria. Nicknamed the "gateway to Syria," the gap separates the An-Nusayriyah Mountains and Jabal Zawiya from the Lebanon and Anti-Lebanon Mountains. The small Nahr al-Kabir river runs down the Gap to the Syrian coast into the Mediterranean Sea at Arida.

For hundreds of years, traders and invaders have found the Homs Gap an important route from the coast to the country's interior and to other parts of Asia because it "provides the easiest access between the Mediterranean coast and the Syrian interior." The gap is also the only large crossing open year-round across the mountain ranges.

Today, the highway and railroad in Homs to the Lebanese port of Tripoli run through the gap. A pipeline carrying oil also runs through the gap. In addition, the Krak des Chevaliers castle is in the Homs Gap. The castle was built in 1031 AD to guard the strategic passageway during the First Crusade, and changed hands several times during the rest of the Crusades.
