= Lebanon–Syria border clashes =

Lebanon–Syria border clashes may refer to:

- Lebanon–Syria border clashes (2012–2017)
- Hezbollah–Syria clashes (2024–present)
- Lebanon–Syria border clashes (March 2025–present)
