= N6-Cyclopentyladenosine =

N^{6}-Cyclopentyladenosine

Names
- IUPAC name N^{6}-Cyclopentyladenosine
- Systematic IUPAC name (2R,3R,4S,5R)-2-[6-(Cyclopentylamino)-9H-purin-9-yl]-5-(hydroxymethyl)oxolane-3,4-diol

Identifiers
CAS Number	41552-82-3
3D model (JSmol)	Interactive image
ChemSpider	571479
PubChem CID	657378
UNII	7LG47VG1ID
CompTox Dashboard (EPA)	DTXSID80961807
- InChI: InChI=1S/C15H21N5O4/c21-5-9-11(22)12(23)15(24-9)20-7-18-10-13(16-6-17-14(10)20)19-8-3-1-2-4-8/h6-9,11-12,15,21-23H,1-5H2,(H,16,17,19)/t9-,11-,12-,15-/m1/s1 Key: SQMWSBKSHWARHU-SDBHATRESA-N; InChI=1/C15H21N5O4/c21-5-9-11(22)12(23)15(24-9)20-7-18-10-13(16-6-17-14(10)20)19-8-3-1-2-4-8/h6-9,11-12,15,21-23H,1-5H2,(H,16,17,19)/t9-,11-,12-,15-/m1/s1 Key: SQMWSBKSHWARHU-SDBHATREBV
- SMILES: C1CCC(C1)NC2=NC=NC3=C2N=CN3[C@H]4[C@@H]([C@@H]([C@H](O4)CO)O)O

Properties
Chemical formula	C_{15}H_{21}N_{5}O_{4}
Molar mass	335.364 g·mol^{−1}
- Except where otherwise noted, data are given for materials in their standard state (at 25 °C [77 °F], 100 kPa). verify (what is ?) Infobox references

N^{6}-Cyclopentyladenosine (CPA) is a drug which acts as a selective adenosine A_{1} receptor agonist. It has mainly cardiovascular effects with only subtle alterations of behavior. CPA is widely used in scientific research into the adenosine receptors and has been used to derive a large family of derivatives.

== See also ==
- N^{6}-Methyladenosine
