= Theophylline/ephedrine =

Combination of theophylline and ephedrine used to treat asthma

- Theophylline

- Ephedrine

Combination of
- Theophylline: Adenosine receptor antagonist
- Ephedrine: Norepinephrine releasing agent

Clinical data
- Trade names: Franol, others
- Other names: Theophylline/ephedrine; Theophylline-(–)-ephedrine compound; Theophylline-ephedrine

Identifiers
- CAS Number: 15766-94-6
- PubChem CID: 86278139
- ChemSpider: 34992091
- UNII: LMS3EG69X8

Theophylline ephedrine (INN), or theophylline/ephedrine, sold under the brand name Franol among others, is a fixed-dose combination formulation of theophylline, an adenosine receptor antagonist, and ephedrine, a norepinephrine releasing agent and indirectly acting sympathomimetic agent, which has been used as a bronchodilator in the treatment of asthma and as a nasal decongestant. It was first studied and used to treat asthma in the 1930s or 1940s and combinations of the two drugs subsequently became widely used. A ratio of 5:1 theophylline to ephedrine is usually used in combinations of the drugs. Later research found that the combination was no more effective for asthma than theophylline alone but produced more side effects.

Combinations of theophylline, ephedrine, and phenobarbital (brand name Tedral among others) have also been widely used to treat asthma. Many such combinations have been marketed with numerous brand names. Theophylline has also been marketed in combination with other ephedrine-like sympathomimetics like racephedrine and pseudoephedrine and with other barbiturates such as amobarbital and butabarbital, among other drugs. A combination of theophylline, ephedrine, and hydroxyzine has been marketed under the brand name Marax among others as well. Combinations of theophylline, ephedrine, and a barbiturate were later phased out in favor of combinations of theophylline and ephedrine alone (e.g., brand name Franol). Fixed-dose combinations of theophylline and ephedrine were abandoned after the 1970s as they did not allow for dose titration in asthma therapy owing to the toxicity of ephedrine.

The effects of theophylline/ephedrine as a performance-enhancing drug in exercise and sports have been studied. Use of theophylline/ephedrine combinations has led to disqualification of elite athletes due to ephedrine being banned in competitive sports.

== See also ==
- Cafedrine
- Fenethylline
- Theodrenaline
