= Arida Border Crossing =

Arida Border Crossing مركز حدود العريضة
- Coordinates: 34°38′08″N 35°58′34″E
- Carries: Commercial Goods, Vehicles
- Crosses: Lebanon–Syria border
- Locale: Lebanon; Syria
- Begins: Arida, Lebanon
- Ends: Tartus, Syria
- Official name: Arida Border Crossing

Characteristics
- Traversable?: Yes

Statistics
- Daily traffic: Yes
- Toll: No

The Arida Border Crossing (Arabic: مركز حدود العريضة) is an international border crossing between Syria and Lebanon in Arida, Lebanon. It is situated on the coastal international highway between Tartus and Tripoli, Lebanon.

== See also ==
- Lebanon–Syria border
