= Hawch Beit Ismail =

Village in Baalbek-Hermel, Lebanon

Coordinates: 34°27′21″N 36°28′57″E

Hawch Beit Ismail حوش بَيْت إِسْمَاعِيل
- Interactive map of Hawch Beit Ismail
- Country: Lebanon
- Governorate: Baalbek-Hermel Governorate

Hawch Beit Ismail (Arabic: حوش بَيْت إِسْمَاعِيل, romanized: Hawsh Bayt ʾIsmāʿīl) is a village in Baalbek-Hermel Governorate, Lebanon. Located near the border of the Syrian Arab Republic, its nearby localities include the Syrian villages Al-Masriyah and Hawsh al-Sayyid Ali. For a short-time, Hawch Beit Ismail was occupied by fighters of the Syrian caretaker and transitional government.

== See also ==
- Qasr
- Hawik
