= Qasr, Lebanon =

Qasr قصر
- Village
- Location in Lebanon
- Coordinates: 34°28′53″N 36°26′27″E
- Country: Lebanon
- Governorate: Baalbek-Hermel Governorate
- District: Hermel District
- Time zone: UTC+2 (EET)
  - Summer (DST): +3

Qasr (Arabic: قصر, romanized: Qaṣr, lit. 'Palace') is a village located in the Hermel District of the Baalbek-Hermel Governorate in Lebanon. For a short time, it was occupied by fighters of Syria's caretaker and transitional government.

== See also ==
- Hawch Beit Ismail
- Hawik
