= Arida, Lebanon =

Arida العريضة
- Location in Lebanon
- Coordinates: 34°38′00″N 35°58′40″E
- Country: Lebanon
- Governorate: Akkar
- District: Akkar
- Time zone: UTC+2 (EET)
  - Summer (DST): +3

Arida (Arabic: العريضة, romanized: al-ʿArīḍah), also spelled Aarida, is a village in northern Lebanon, on the Syrian border, which is formed by the mouth of the Nahr al-Kabir al-Janoubi. It is located in the Akkar District of the Akkar Governorate. Its inhabitants are Sunni Muslims although there exists a small minority of Alawites. The Arida Border Crossing is the coastal border crossing between Lebanon and Syria.

== Demographics ==
In 2014, Muslims made up 100% of registered voters in Arida. 86.80% of the voters were Sunni Muslims and 12.98% were Alawites.
