= Humanitarian access =

Legal term

Humanitarian access is a specific legal term, that referred to the ability of neutral humanitarian actors (such as the United Nations, the ICRC, and foreign or local NGOs), to enter an area during a conflict, to provide humanitarian aid as well as monitor and promote human rights.

As of 2007, a region where humanitarian access is a problem is Darfur. Whether due to restrictions posed by the Government or by other parties to the conflict, or whether due to general insecurity, humanitarian access is bad in many areas and continues to worsen, as the areas of limited or no access for humanitarians rise.
