= Fenethylline =

Codrug of amphetamine and theophylline

Fenethylline INN: Fenetylline

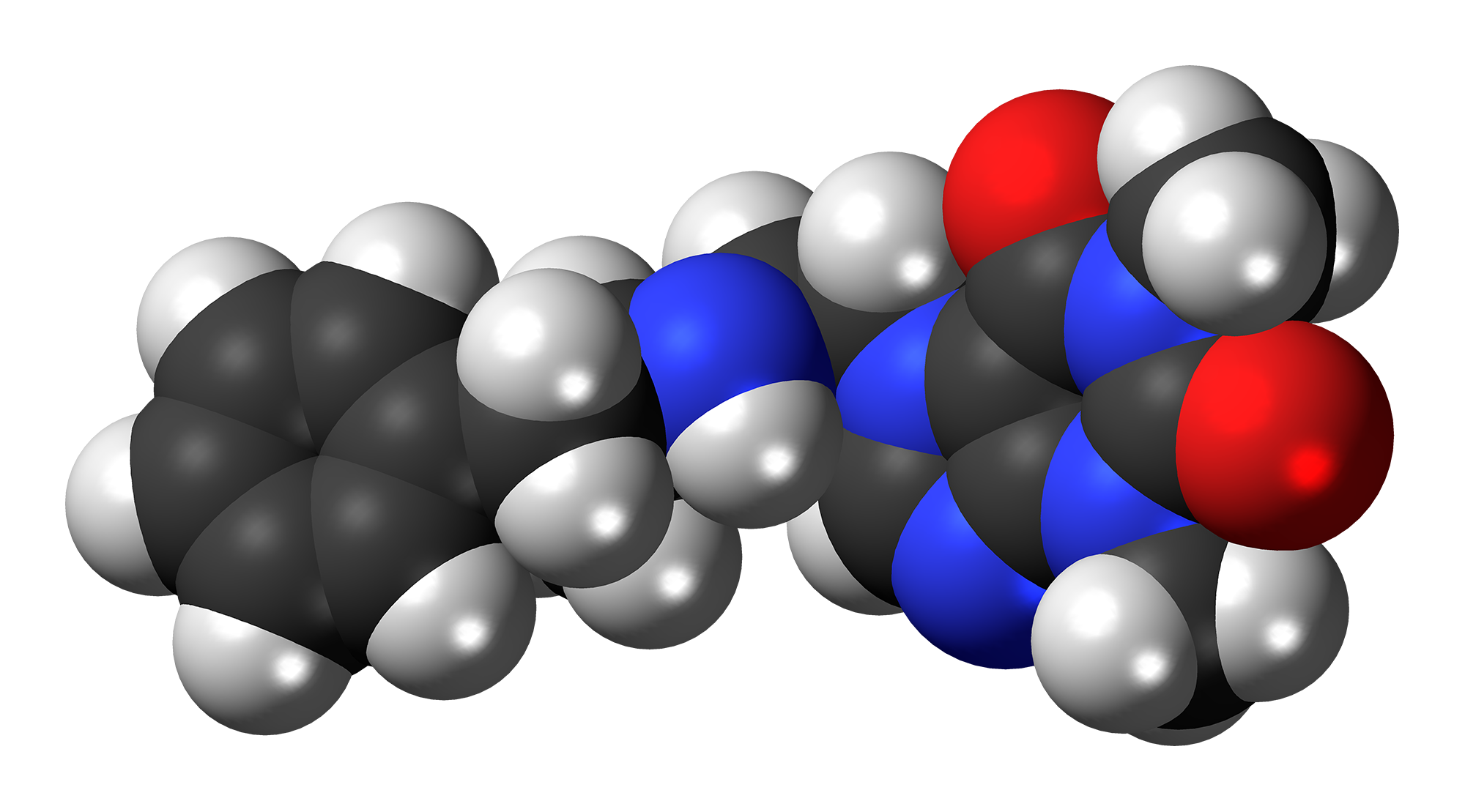

Clinical data
- Other names: Phenethylline, amphetaminoethyltheophylline, amfetyline
- AHFS/Drugs.com: International Drug Names
- Routes of administration: Oral
- ATC code: N06BA10 (WHO)

Legal status
- Legal status: AU: S9 (Prohibited substance); BR: Class A3 (Psychoactive drugs); CA: Schedule III; DE: Anlage III (Special prescription form required); UK: Class C; US: Schedule I

Identifiers
- IUPAC name: (RS)-1,3-dimethyl- 7-[2-(1-phenylpropan-2-ylamino)ethyl]purine- 2,6-dione
- CAS Number: 3736-08-1
- PubChem CID: 19527
- DrugBank: DB01482
- ChemSpider: 18398
- UNII: YZ0N7VL5R3
- KEGG: D07944
- ChEBI: CHEBI:135451
- ChEMBL: ChEMBL2111152
- CompTox Dashboard (EPA): DTXSID50859686
- ECHA InfoCard: 100.115.827

Chemical and physical data
- Formula: C_{18}H_{23}N_{5}O_{2}
- Molar mass: 341.415 g·mol^{−1}
- 3D model (JSmol): Interactive image
- Chirality: Racemic mixture
- SMILES: O=C2N(c1ncn(c1C(=O)N2C)CCNC(C)Cc3ccccc3)C
- InChI: InChI=1S/C18H23N5O2/c1-13(11-14-7-5-4-6-8-14)19-9-10-23-12-20-16-15(23)17(24)22(3)18(25)21(16)2/h4-8,12-13,19H,9-11H2,1-3H3; Key:NMCHYWGKBADVMK-UHFFFAOYSA-N

Fenethylline (BAN, USAN) or fenetylline (INN) is a codrug of amphetamine and theophylline and so a mutual prodrug of both. It is also spelled phenethylline; other names for it are amphetaminoethyltheophylline and amfetyline. The drug has been marketed for use as a psychostimulant under the brand names Captagon, Biocapton, and Fitton. The brand name "Captagon" (often in lowercase as "captagon") is often used generically to describe illicitly produced and sold fenethylline.

In 2023, the UK ministry of foreign affairs estimated that Syria was responsible for about 80% of the global production of Captagon, which, according to then-secretary for the Middle East Tariq Ahmad, was exported from the port of Latakia with the assistance of the Syrian government under the command of Maher al-Assad. The same report issued by the UK government also suggested that "independent experts estimate [the Captagon trade market] could be worth up to $57 billion", and added that "it is worth approximately 3 times the combined trade of the Mexican cartels." Syria analyst and Century International fellow Sam Heller et al. challenged the credibility of the $57bn figure, which is ten times the Syrian annual budget and almost three times the country's GDP. A 2021 report by the New Lines Institute based on the retail value of annual captagon seizures estimated the drug's entire market to be worth at least $5.7bn.

Smuggling of fenethylline became Syria's principal export, exceeding the total of all other exports under the Assad regime during the Syrian civil war (2011–2024). It was the world's largest producer of the drug. A large quantity of Captagon tablets, ready for clandestine export, was captured by anti-Assad forces that took control of Damascus in December 2024.

== History ==
Fenethylline was first synthesized by the German pharmaceutical firm Degussa AG in 1961 and used for around 25 years as a milder alternative to amphetamine and related compounds. Although there are no FDA-approved indications for fenethylline, it was used for the treatment of "hyperkinetic children", in what would now be called attention deficit hyperactivity disorder, and, less commonly, for narcolepsy and depression. One of the main advantages of fenethylline was that it does not increase blood pressure to the same extent as an equivalent dose of amphetamine and so could be used in patients with cardiovascular conditions.

Fenethylline was considered to have fewer side effects and less potential for abuse than amphetamine. However, because its chemical composition is similar to amphetamine's, fenethylline was listed in 1981 as a Schedule I controlled substance in the United States, and it became illegal in most countries in 1986 after being listed by the World Health Organization for international scheduling under the Convention on Psychotropic Substances.

== Pharmacology ==
The fenethylline molecule results when theophylline is covalently linked with amphetamine by an alkyl chain.

Fenethylline is metabolized by the body to form two drugs, amphetamine (24.5% of oral dose) and theophylline (13.7% of oral dose), both of which are active stimulants. The physiological effects of fenethylline therefore seem to result from a combination of these two compounds, although it is not entirely clear how, and seems to involve a synergistic effect between amphetamine and theophylline produced following metabolism. The pharmacological actions of fenethylline before cleavage also remain poorly established, though it appears to act directly at several serotonin receptors.

== Abuse and illegal trade ==
Abuse of fenethylline using the former brand name Captagon is common in the Middle East, and counterfeit versions of the drug continue to be available despite its illegality. Fenethylline is much less common outside of the Middle East, to the point that police may not recognize the drug. Fenethylline production and export were a significant industry sponsored by Bashar al-Assad's government, with revenue from its exports contributing more than 90% of its foreign currency. After the fall of al-Assad's government in Syria, Captagon trade fell by around 90%. The Assad regime's annual fenethylline revenues were estimated to have been worth US$57 billion in 2022, about three times the total trade of the entire Mexican illicit drug market. Later research demonstrated that this assistance, largely the financing of production and sponsoring networks of drug dealers, was undertaken through the former Assad regime's Military Intelligence Directorate (Syria). In July 2019 in Lebanon, captagon was sold for $1.50 to $2.00 a pill. In 2021 in Syria, low-quality pills were sold locally for less than $1, while high-quality pills are increasingly smuggled abroad and may cost upwards of $14 each in Saudi Arabia.

Many of these counterfeit "Captagon" tablets contain other amphetamine derivatives that are easier to produce, but are pressed and stamped to look like Captagon pills. Some counterfeit Captagon pills analysed do contain fenethylline, indicating that illicit production of the drug continues to take place. These illicit pills often contain "a mix of amphetamines, caffeine and various fillers", which are sometimes referred to as "captagon" (with a lowercase "c").

According to some leaks, militant groups export the drug in exchange for weapons and cash. According to Abdelelah Mohammed Al-Sharif, secretary general of the National Committee for Narcotics Control and assistant director of Anti-Drug and Preventative Affairs, forty percent of users between the ages of twelve and twenty-two in Saudi Arabia are addicted to fenethylline. In 2017, fenethylline was the most popular recreational drug in the Arabian Peninsula.

In October 2015, a member of the Saudi royal family, Prince Abdel Mohsen Bin Walid Bin Abdulaziz, and four others were detained in Beirut on charges of drug trafficking after airport security discovered two tons of fenethylline pills and some cocaine on a private jet scheduled to depart for Riyadh, the capital of Saudi Arabia. The following month, Agence France-Presse reported that Turkish authorities had seized two tonnes of fenethylline—about eleven million pills—during raids in the Hatay region on the Syrian border. The pills had been produced in Syria and were being shipped to countries in the Arab states of the Persian Gulf.

In December 2015, the Lebanese Army announced that it had discovered two large-scale drug production workshops in the north of the country and seized large quantities of fenethylline pills. Two days earlier, three tons of fenethylline and hashish were seized at Beirut Airport, concealed in school desks being exported to Egypt.

Traces of the drug were found on a mobile phone used by Mohamed Lahouaiej Bouhlel, a French-Tunisian who killed eighty-four civilians in Nice on Bastille Day in 2016.

In May 2017, French customs at Charles de Gaulle Airport seized 750,000 fenethylline pills being transported from Lebanon to Saudi Arabia. In 2017, two other consignments of pills were found at Charles de Gaulle Airport: in January, heading for the Czech Republic, and in February, hidden in steel moulds. Further investigation showed that the seized products mainly contained a mixture of amphetamine and theophylline.

In January 2018, Saudi Arabia seized 1.3 million fenethylline pills at the Al-Haditha crossing near the border with Jordan. In December 2018, Greece intercepted a Syrian ship sailing for Libya, carrying six tonnes of processed cannabis and three million fenethylline pills. In July 2019, a shipment of 33 million fenethylline pills, weighing 5.25 tonnes, was seized in Greece coming from Syria. In July 2019, 800,000 fenethylline pills were found on a boat in the United Arab Emirates. In August 2019, Saudi customs at Al-Haditha seized over 2.5 million fenethylline pills found inside a truck and a private vehicle.

In February 2020, the UAE found 35 million fenethylline pills in a shipment of electric cables from Syria to Jebel Ali. In April 2020, Saudi Arabia seized 44.7 million fenethylline pills smuggled from Syria, and citing drug smuggling concerns, imposed an import ban on fruits and vegetables from Lebanon, causing the price of Lebanese lettuce to plummet.

In July 2020, an anti-drug operation coordinated in Italy by the Italian Guardia di Finanza and Customs and Monopolies Agency seized fourteen tonnes of amphetamines, labeled as Captagon, smuggled from Syria and initially thought by the Italian authorities to have been produced by ISIS, which were found in three shipping containers filled with around 84 million pills, in the southern port of Salerno.

In November 2020, Egypt seized two shipments of fenethylline pills at Damietta port coming from Syria. The first had over 3.2 million tablets, while the second contained 11 million. In December 2020, Italian authorities seized about 14 tonnes of fenethylline arriving from Latakia, Syria, and heading towards Libya, consisting of about 85 million pills, worth around $1 billion.

In January 2021, Egyptian authorities seized eight tons of fenethylline and another eight tons of hashish at Port Said, from a shipment that arrived from Lebanon. In February 2021, Lebanese customs seized at Beirut port a shipment of 5 million fenethylline pills hidden in a tile-making machine, intended for Greece and Saudi Arabia. In April 2021, Saudi authorities discovered 5.3 million fenethylline pills hidden in fruits imported from Lebanon.

=== Production in Syria ===
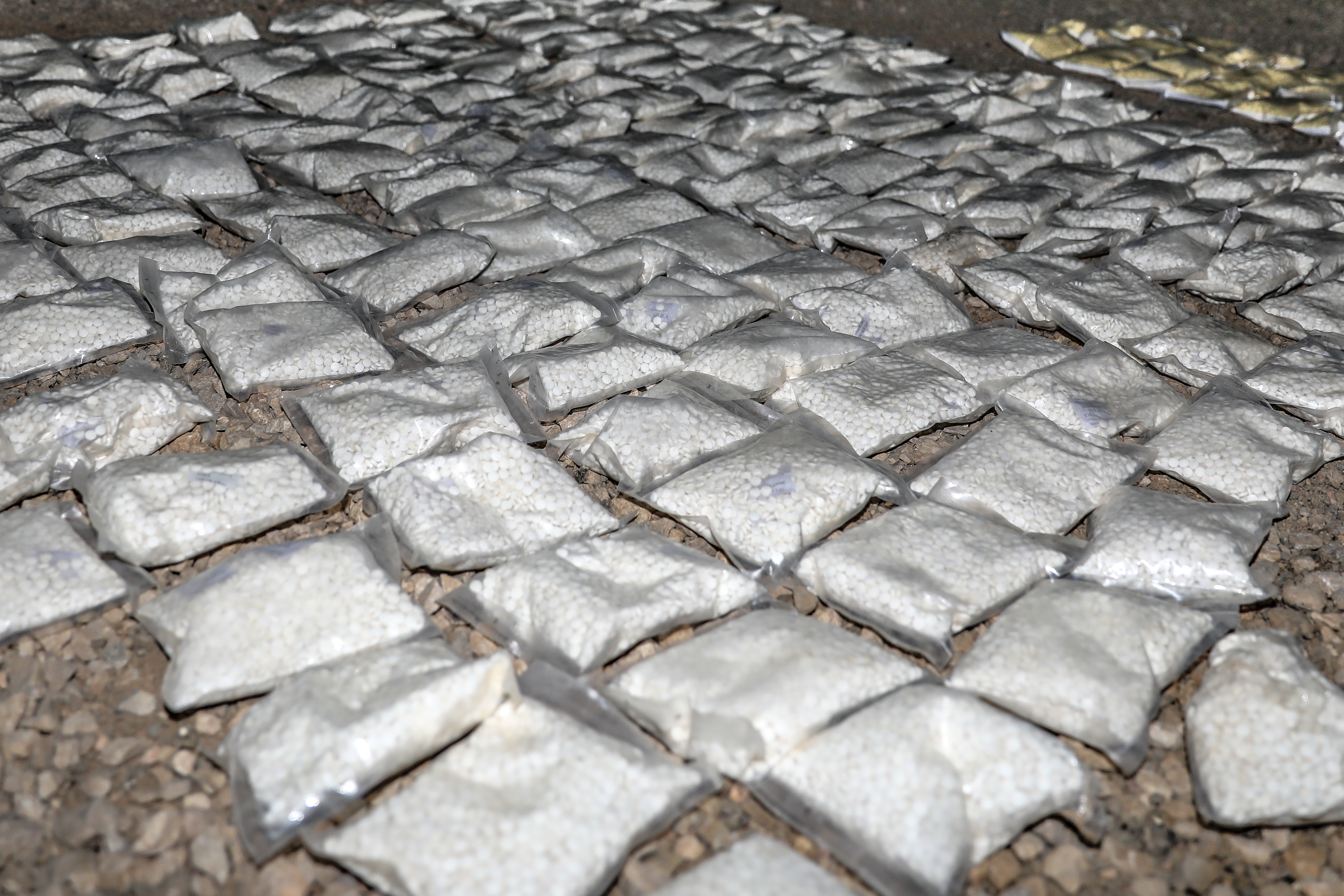
127 bags of fenethylline seized in Syria before being destroyed in May 2018

The drug fenethylline has played a role in the Syrian civil war. The production and sale of fenethylline generates large revenues which are likely used to fund the purchase of weapons, and fenethylline is used as a stimulant by combatants. Poverty and international sanctions that limit legal exports are contributing factors. In May 2021, The Guardian described the effects of fenethylline production in Syria on the economy as "a dirty business that is creating a near-narco-state". Drug money flowing into Syria is destabilizing legitimate businesses, positioning it as the global centre of fenethylline production, with increased industrialization, adaptation, and technical sophistication.

In June 2021, Saudi authorities at Jeddah port seized 14 million fenethylline tablets hidden inside a shipment of iron plates coming from Lebanon. In the same month, Saudi authorities seized a shipment of 4.5 million fenethylline pills, smuggled inside several orange cartons, at Jeddah port. In July 2021, Saudi customs discovered 2.1 million fenethylline pills at Al-Haditha hidden in a tomato paste shipment.

In December 2024, shortly after the Assad government collapsed, Syrian former-rebels found warehouses filled with Captagon alongside factory equipment to make it and also found some Captagon pills inside the copper coils of new voltage stabilisers, showing one way the former Syrian government used to smuggle Captagon out of the country. The Captagon was all destroyed by the new government; "Khattab", a pseudonym of one of the former rebels said "We destroyed and burned it because it's harmful to people. It harms nature and people and humans."

The New York Times reported in December 2021 that the Syrian Army's elite 4th Armoured Division, commanded by Maher al-Assad, the brother of Syrian President Bashar al-Assad, oversaw much of the production and distribution of fenethylline, among other drugs. The unit controlled manufacturing facilities, packing plants, and smuggling networks all across Syria, and had started to deal in crystal meth. The division's security bureau, headed by Maj. Gen. Ghassan Bilal, provided protection for factories and along smuggling routes to the port city Latakia and to border crossings with Jordan and Lebanon. Jihad Yazigi, editor of The Syria Report, reported that fenethylline had "probably become Syria's most important source of foreign currency."

=== Military use ===
Fenethylline is a major stimulant, sometimes dubbed the "jihad drug", used by some jihadist fighters. It quickly produces a euphoric intensity in users, allowing them to stay awake for a very long time, remaining more calm and focused under the effects of the drug, which allows the senses to stay at more operational levels. It also helps to subdue feelings of fear and hunger during lengthy operations. Psychiatrist Robert Keisling said that the drug "gives you a sense of well-being and euphoria", along with the thought that "you're invincible and that nothing can harm you." Those who go on jihad missions take high doses to prepare, says a former fighter associated with the Muslim Brotherhood. He described the effect: "They go blank. Their heart rate spikes. They lose all connection to their emotions and thoughts." Some commented on this effect as a "zombie-like detachment".

An illegal Syrian manufacturer told New York Magazine in 2015 of the effect the drug had on fighters: "[If] someone takes many pills, like 30 or so, they become violent and crazy, paranoid, unafraid of anything. They'll have a thirst for fighting and killing and will shoot at whatever they see. They lose any feeling or empathy for the people in front of them and can kill them without caring at all."

According to some commentators, fighters taking the drug in Syria were better able to tolerate the pain of being shot. A drug control officer in the central city of Homs told Reuters that protestors and fighters were able to resist painful interrogations better while on fenethylline. Former fighters have told the media that the pills helped them overcome their fear. Doctors report that the drug has dangerous side effects, including psychosis and brain damage. According to former fighters, hundreds became addicted to the pills they were given by brigade leaders without knowing what they were taking.

Fenethylline use was associated with the rise of jihadist group ISIS. One 19-year-old fighter named Kareem, who said he fought alongside ISIS for more than a year, told CNN in 2014: "They gave us drugs, hallucinogenic pills that would make you go to battle not caring if you live or die."

In February 2023, Israel's Ministry of Defense claimed to have thwarted an attempt to smuggle thousands of fenethylline tablets from the West Bank into the Gaza Strip. Hamas claimed it had seized 50,000 fenethylline pills on the border, and claimed Israel was attempting to dope Gaza.

Israel has publicly stated that fenethylline was used during the October 7 attacks, but this has been doubted by Caroline Rose, director of New Lines Institute's Strategic Blind Spots Portfolio. Israeli forces said they had found fenethylline-containing tablets, powder, and liquid on the bodies of the attackers. Rose said that she had never seen fenethylline made in liquid form. While precursor chemicals for fenethylline tend to be in powdered form, she said, fenethylline itself is not commonly a powder. She concluded "I find it somewhat difficult to believe that, in a single raid, we find two new forms of Captagon."

Videos compiled by the Israeli government of the Hamas attack—cobbled together from cell phones, GoPros, as well as car and surveillance cameras—allege that at least some of the militants were under the influence of the drug. Rose also said that "Fighters might have taken cocaine right before, or captagon, or no substances at all. Some might have taken caffeine, some may be sleep deprived...but there's no way that captagon was a factor to blame in the violence and atrocities that we witnessed on October 7".

== Synthesis ==
According to reviewers Pergolizzi Jr., et al., writing in 2024, the clandestine chemical synthesis of fenethylline is "straightforward and inexpensive".

Small-scale synthesis in academic laboratories is equally straightforward:

Synthesis of fenethylline

The overall transformation is accomplished in two laboratory steps, each requiring extraction and purification. In the first step, theophylline (1) is alkylated in a substitution reaction using 1-bromo-2-chloroethane (2) to give 7-(β-chloroethyl) theophylline (Benaphyllin, Eupnophile; 3). In the second step, the primary amine in amphetamine (4) displaces the terminal halide in 3 to give fenethylline (5).

The synthesis can also be performed with analogous reagents and solvents. Use of tetradeutero-vic‑dichloroethane instead of vic‑chlorobromoethane yields reasonably a perdeuterated-bridge analogue.

== Identification in biological samples ==
A gas chromatography–mass spectrometry (GC–MS) method for the determination of fenethylline and related substances in plasma, urine, and hair has been developed, suggesting that hair testing can be useful for determining a drug history of fenethylline, and discrimination between fenethylline and its precursor, amphetamine.

== See also ==
- Amfecloral
- Cafedrine
- Famprofazone
- Fencamine
- Theodrenaline
- Theophylline/ephedrine
- ZDCM-04
