= Dabousieh =

Dabousieh الدبوسية
- Village
- Location in Syria
- Coordinates: 34°38′53″N 36°7′8″E
- Country: Syria
- Governorate: Homs
- District: Talkalakh District
- Subdistrict: Talkalakh Subdistrict

Population (2004)
  - Total: 1,532
- Time zone: UTC+2 (EET)
  - Summer (DST): UTC+3 (EEST)
- City Qrya Pcode: C2793

Dabousieh (Arabic: الدبوسية, romanized: ad-Dabbūsīyah), or also known as Maarabu-Dabousieh (معربو - الدبوسية), is a Syrian village located in Talkalakh District, Homs. According to the Syria Central Bureau of Statistics (CBS), Dabousieh had a population of 1,532 in the 2004 census. In 2024, Homs Governorate completed rehabilitation work at the Dabousieh border crossing between Syria and Lebanon.
