= Tonapofylline =

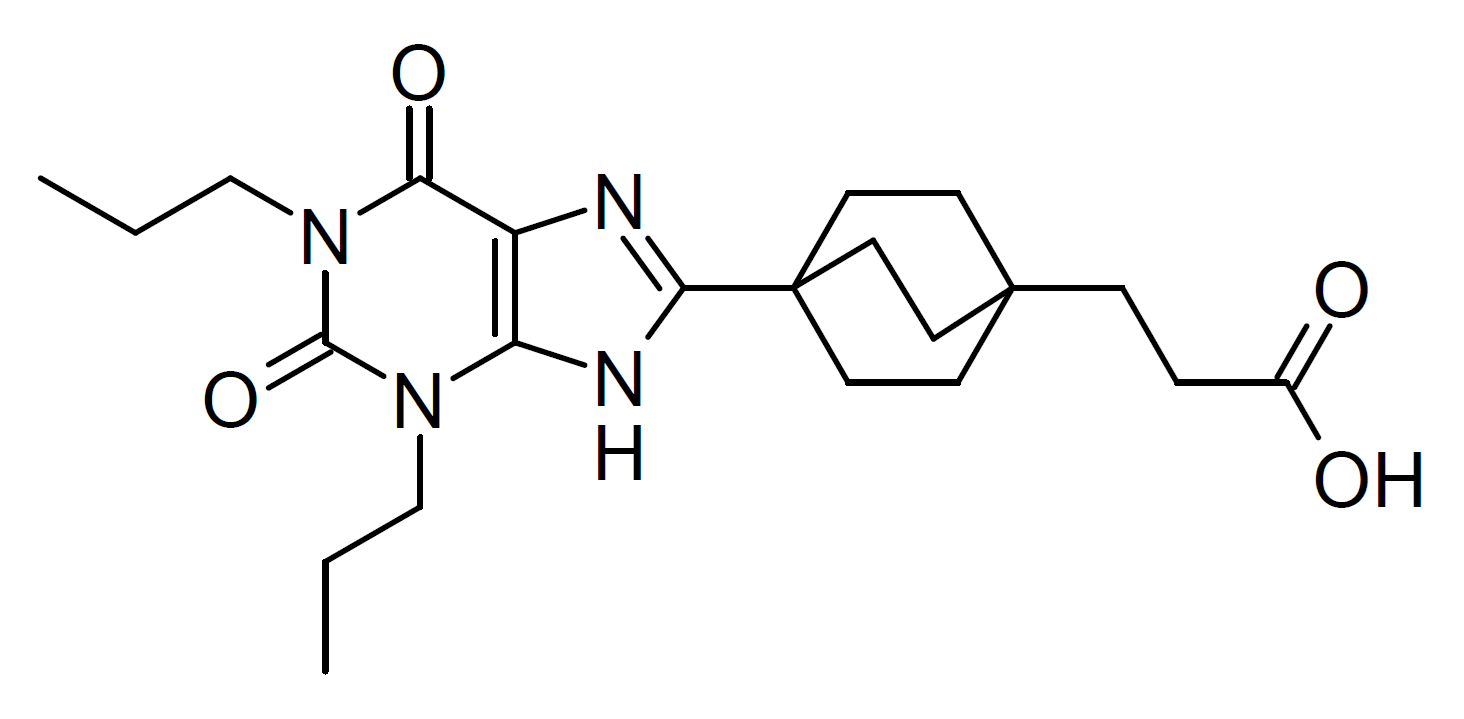

Identifiers
- IUPAC name: 3-[4-(2,6-dioxo-1,3-dipropyl-7H-purin-8-yl)-1-bicyclo[2.2.2]octanyl]propanoic acid
- CAS Number: 340021-17-2
- PubChem CID: 216466
- IUPHAR/BPS: 5605
- DrugBank: DB12569
- ChemSpider: 187607
- UNII: 83VNU4U44T
- KEGG: D09684
- ChEBI: CHEBI:177398
- ChEMBL: ChEMBL414157
- CompTox Dashboard (EPA): DTXSID30187611

Chemical and physical data
- Formula: C_{22}H_{32}N_{4}O_{4}
- Molar mass: 416.522 g·mol^{−1}
- 3D model (JSmol): Interactive image
- SMILES: CCCN1C2=C(C(=O)N(C1=O)CCC)NC(=N2)C34CCC(CC3)(CC4)CCC(=O)O
- InChI: InChI=1S/C22H32N4O4/c1-3-13-25-17-16(18(29)26(14-4-2)20(25)30)23-19(24-17)22-10-7-21(8-11-22,9-12-22)6-5-15(27)28/h3-14H2,1-2H3,(H,23,24)(H,27,28); Key:ZWTVVWUOTJRXKM-UHFFFAOYSA-N

Tonapofylline (BG-9928) is a drug which acts as a potent and selective antagonist for the adenosine A_{1} receptor. It was developed as a potential agent for the treatment of heart failure by increasing sodium excretion by the kidneys, and reached Phase III human clinical trials, showing reasonable efficacy with a good safety profile. However, it was ultimately not adopted for medical use, though it continues to be used in research. Its activity as a phosphodiesterase inhibitor does not appear to have been tested, though most related xanthine derivatives are phosphodiesterase inhibitors as well as adenosine receptor antagonists.

== See also ==
- DPCPX
