= Adenosine A1 receptor =

Cell surface receptor found in humans

ADORA1

Identifiers
- Aliases: ADORA1, RDC7, adenosine A1 receptor
- External IDs: OMIM: 102775; MGI: 99401; GeneCards: ADORA1

Gene location (Human)
Chr.	Chromosome 1 (human)
Band	1q32.1	Start	203,090,654 bp
Band	1q32.1	End	203,167,405 bp

Gene location (Mouse)
Chr.	Chromosome 1 (mouse)
Band	1|1 E4	Start	134,126,961 bp
Band	1|1 E4	End	134,163,169 bp
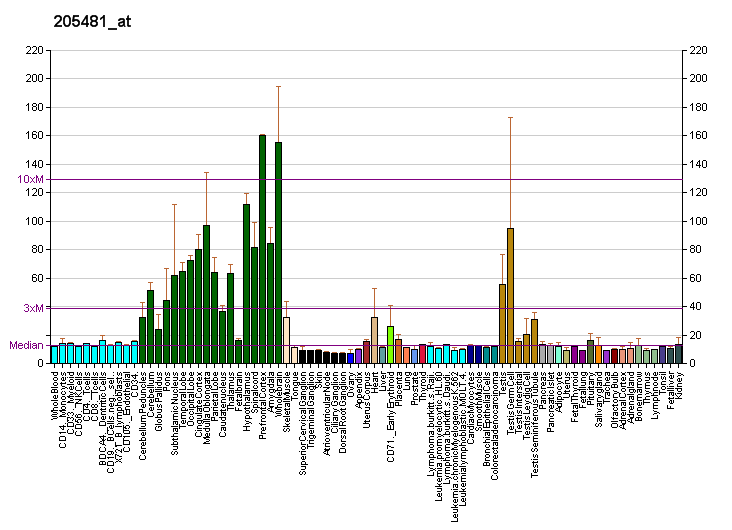

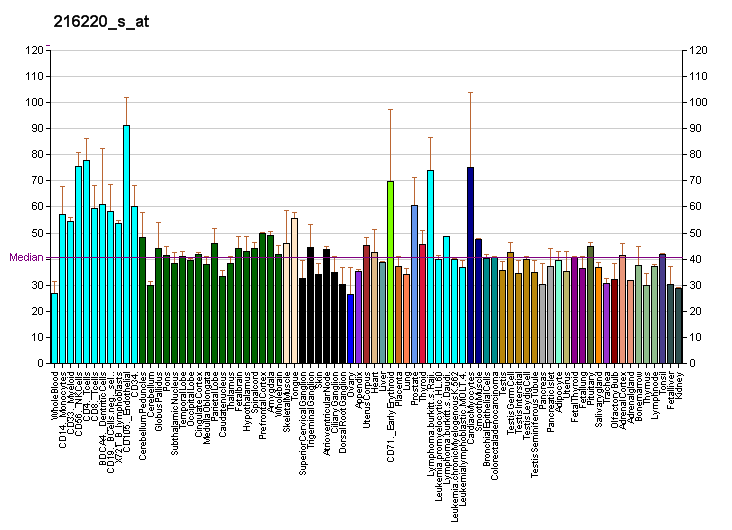
RNA expression pattern
Bgee	Human / Mouse (ortholog); Top expressed in: inferior ganglion of vagus nerve; prefrontal cortex; C1 segment; lateral nuclear group of thalamus; Brodmann area 10; putamen; pons; amygdala; ventral tegmental area; right frontal lobe / Top expressed in: pontine nuclei; dentate gyrus of hippocampal formation granule cell; medial geniculate nucleus; cerebellar cortex; cerebellar vermis; subiculum; facial motor nucleus; lobe of cerebellum; superior frontal gyrus; barrel cortex; More reference expression data
BioGPS	More reference expression data
Gene ontology
Molecular function	G-protein beta/gamma-subunit complex binding; G protein-coupled adenosine receptor activity; G protein-coupled receptor activity; signal transducer activity; purine nucleoside binding; protein binding; protein heterodimerization activity; phospholipase C activity; heterotrimeric G-protein binding; G protein-coupled receptor binding; heat shock protein binding; neurotransmitter receptor activity involved in regulation of presynaptic cytosolic calcium ion concentration
Cellular component	integral component of membrane; cell body; postsynaptic membrane; membrane; postsynaptic density; dendritic spine; synapse; integral component of plasma membrane; presynaptic active zone; terminal bouton; soma; dendrite; basolateral plasma membrane; endoplasmic reticulum; axolemma; asymmetric synapse; presynaptic membrane; endomembrane system; plasma membrane; integral component of postsynaptic membrane; integral component of presynaptic membrane; calyx of Held
Biological process	negative regulation of circadian sleep/wake cycle, non-REM sleep; positive regulation of nucleoside transport; positive regulation of epidermal growth factor-activated receptor activity; G protein-coupled adenosine receptor signaling pathway; negative regulation of neurotrophin production; negative regulation of glutamate secretion; response to hypoxia; negative regulation of acute inflammatory response; adenylate cyclase-inhibiting G protein-coupled receptor signaling pathway; regulation of sensory perception of pain; cognition; positive regulation of protein dephosphorylation; negative regulation of blood pressure; negative regulation of heart contraction; protein targeting to membrane; positive regulation of potassium ion transport; regulation of glomerular filtration; cell-cell signaling; positive regulation of peptide secretion; negative regulation of apoptotic process; nervous system development; detection of temperature stimulus involved in sensory perception of pain; regulation of respiratory gaseous exchange by nervous system process; lipid catabolic process; negative regulation of circadian sleep/wake cycle, sleep; positive regulation of blood pressure; negative regulation of synaptic transmission, GABAergic; negative regulation of renal sodium excretion; excitatory postsynaptic potential; phagocytosis; relaxation of vascular associated smooth muscle; apoptotic signaling pathway; regulation of cardiac muscle contraction; negative regulation of long-term synaptic depression; temperature homeostasis; inflammatory response; negative regulation of mucus secretion; negative regulation of hormone secretion; negative regulation of lipid catabolic process; negative regulation of inflammatory response; negative regulation of leukocyte migration; negative regulation of synaptic transmission, glutamatergic; signal transduction; negative regulation of cell population proliferation; negative regulation of cardiac muscle contraction; G protein-coupled receptor signaling pathway; positive regulation of systemic arterial blood pressure; negative regulation of systemic arterial blood pressure; positive regulation of lipid catabolic process; fatty acid homeostasis; triglyceride homeostasis; negative regulation of long-term synaptic potentiation; positive regulation of neuron death; regulation of cardiac muscle cell contraction; regulation of presynaptic cytosolic calcium ion concentration
Sources:Amigo / QuickGO
Orthologs
Databases	NCBI: entry; OMA: entry
Species	Human	Mouse
Entrez	134	11539
Ensembl	ENSG00000163485	ENSMUSG00000042429
UniProt	P30542	Q60612
RefSeq (mRNA)	NM_000674; NM_001048230; NM_001365065; NM_001365066	NM_001008533; NM_001039510; NM_009629; NM_001282945; NM_001291928 NM_001291930
RefSeq (protein)	NP_000665; NP_001041695; NP_001351994; NP_001351995	NP_001008533; NP_001034599; NP_001269874; NP_001278857; NP_001278859
Location (UCSC)	Chr 1: 203.09 – 203.17 Mb	Chr 1: 134.13 – 134.16 Mb
PubMed search
- Wikidata
View/Edit Human	View/Edit Mouse

The adenosine A_{1} receptor (A1AR) is one member of the adenosine receptor group of G protein-coupled receptors with adenosine as endogenous ligand.

== Biochemistry ==
A_{1} receptors are implicated in sleep promotion by inhibiting wake-promoting cholinergic neurons in the basal forebrain. A_{1} receptors are also present in smooth muscle throughout the vascular system.

In humans, the adenosine A_{1} receptor has been found to be most highly expressed in the brain, with lower expression in other tissues such as the testis, pancreas, and heart.

== Signaling ==
Activation of the adenosine A_{1} receptor by an agonist causes binding of G_{i1/2/3} or G_{o} protein. Binding of G_{i1/2/3} causes an inhibition of adenylate cyclase and, therefore, a decrease in the cAMP concentration. An increase of the inositol triphosphate/diacylglycerol concentration is caused by an activation of phospholipase C, whereas the elevated levels of arachidonic acid are mediated by DAG lipase, which cleaves DAG to form arachidonic acid. Several types of potassium channels are activated but N-, P-, and Q-type calcium channels are inhibited.

== Effect ==
This receptor has an inhibitory function on most of the tissues in which it rests. In the brain, it slows metabolic activity by a combination of actions. At the neuron's synapse, it reduces synaptic vesicle release.

== Ligands ==
Caffeine, as well as theophylline, has been found to antagonize both A_{1} and A_{2A} receptors in the brain.

=== Agonists ===
- 2-Chloro-N(6)-cyclopentyladenosine (CCPA).
- N6-Cyclopentyladenosine
- N(6)-cyclohexyladenosine
- Tecadenoson ((2R,3S,4R)-2-(hydroxymethyl)-5-(6-

((R)-tetrahydrofuran-3-ylamino)-9H-purin-9-yl)-tetrashydrofuran3,4-diol)

- Selodenoson ((2S,3S,4R)-5-(6-(cyclopentylamino)-9Hpurin-9-yl)-N-ethyl-3,4-dihydroxytetrahydrofuran-2-carboxamide)
- Capadenoson (BAY68-4986)
- Benzyloxy-cyclopentyladenosine (BnOCPA) is an A1R selective agonist.

=== PAMs ===
- 2‑Amino-3-(4′-chlorobenzoyl)-4-substituted-5-arylethynyl thiophene # 4e

=== Antagonists ===
Non-selective

- Caffeine
- Theophylline
- CGS-15943

Selective

- 8-Cyclopentyl-1,3-dimethylxanthine (CPX / 8-cyclopentyltheophylline)
- 8-Cyclopentyl-1,3-dipropylxanthine (DPCPX)
- 8-Phenyl-1,3-dipropylxanthine
- Bamifylline
- BG-9719
- Tonapofylline (BG-9928)
- FK-453
- FK-838
- Rolofylline (KW-3902)
- N-0861
- ISAM-CV202

== In the heart ==
In the heart, A_{1} receptors play roles in electrical pacing (chronotropy and dromotropy), fluid balance, local sympathetic regulation, and metabolism.

When bound by adenosine, A_{1} receptors inhibit impulses generated in supraventricular tissue (SA node, AV node) and the Bundle of His/Purkinje system, leading to negative chronotropy (slowing of the heart rate). Specifically, A_{1} receptor activation leads to inactivation of the inwardly rectifying K^{+} current and inhibition of the inward Ca^{2+} current (I_{Ca}) and the 'funny' hyperpolarization-activated current (I_{f}). Adenosine agonism of A1ARs also inhibits release of norepinephrine from cardiac nerves. Norepinephrine is a positive chronotrope, inotrope, and dromotrope, through its agonism of β adrenergic receptors on pacemaker cells and ventricular myocytes.

Collectively, these mechanisms lead to an myocardial depressant effect by decreasing the conduction of electrical impulses and suppressing pacemaker cells function, resulting in a decrease in heart rate. This makes adenosine a useful medication for treating and diagnosing tachyarrhythmias, or excessively fast heart rates. This effect on the A_{1} receptor also explains why there is a brief moment of cardiac standstill when adenosine is administered as a rapid IV push during cardiac resuscitation. The rapid infusion causes a momentary myocardial stunning effect.

In normal physiological states, this serves as protective mechanisms. However, in altered cardiac function, such as hypoperfusion caused by hypotension, heart attack or cardiac arrest caused by nonperfusing bradycardias, adenosine has a negative effect on physiological functioning by preventing necessary compensatory increases in heart rate and blood pressure that attempt to maintain cerebral perfusion.

Metabolically, A1AR activation by endogenous adenosine across the body reduces plasma glucose, lactate, and insulin levels, however A2aR activation increased glucose and lactate levels to an extent greater than the A1AR effect on glucose and lactate. Thus, intravascular administration of adenosine increases the amount of glucose and lactate available in the blood for cardiac myocytes. A1AR activation also partially inhibits glycolysis, slowing its rate to align with oxidative metabolism, which limits post-ischemic damage through reduced H^{+} generation.

In the state of myocardial hypertrophy and remodeling, interstitial adenosine and the expression of the A1AR receptor are both increased. After transition to heart failure however, overexpression of A1AR is no longer present. Excess A1AR expression can induce cardiomyopathy, cardiac dilatation, and cardiac hypertrophy. Cardiac failure may involve increased A1AR expression and decreased adenosine in physical models of cardiac overload and in dysfunction induced by TNFα. Heart failure often involves secretion of atrial natriuretic peptide to compensate for reduced renal perfusion and thus, secretion of electrolytes. A1AR activation also increases secretion of atrial natriuretic peptide from atrial myocytes.
