= Hawsh al-Sayyid Ali =

Hawsh al-Sayyid Ali حوش السيد علي Hosh al-Sayyed Ali
- Village
- Location in Syria
- Coordinates: 34°27′37″N 36°29′50″E
- Country: Syria
- Governorate: Homs
- District: Al-Qusayr
- Subdistrict: Al-Qusayr

Population (2004)
  - Total: 541
- Time zone: UTC+3 (EET)
  - Summer (DST): UTC+2 (EEST)

Hawsh al-Sayyid Ali (Arabic: حوش السيد علي, also known as Hosh al-Sayyed Ali) is a village in central Syria, administratively part of the Homs Governorate, located southwest of Homs and immediately east of the border with Lebanon. Nearby localities include al-Masriyah to the northwest, al-Qusayr to the northeast, Rablah to the east, al-Nizariyah to the south. According to the Central Bureau of Statistics (CBS), Hawsh al-Sayyid Ali had a population of 541 in the 2004 census. Its inhabitants are predominantly Shia Muslims. By 12 April 2025, the village was uninhabited.
