= Ba'athist Syrian Captagon industry =

Illicit drug manufacturing by Syria

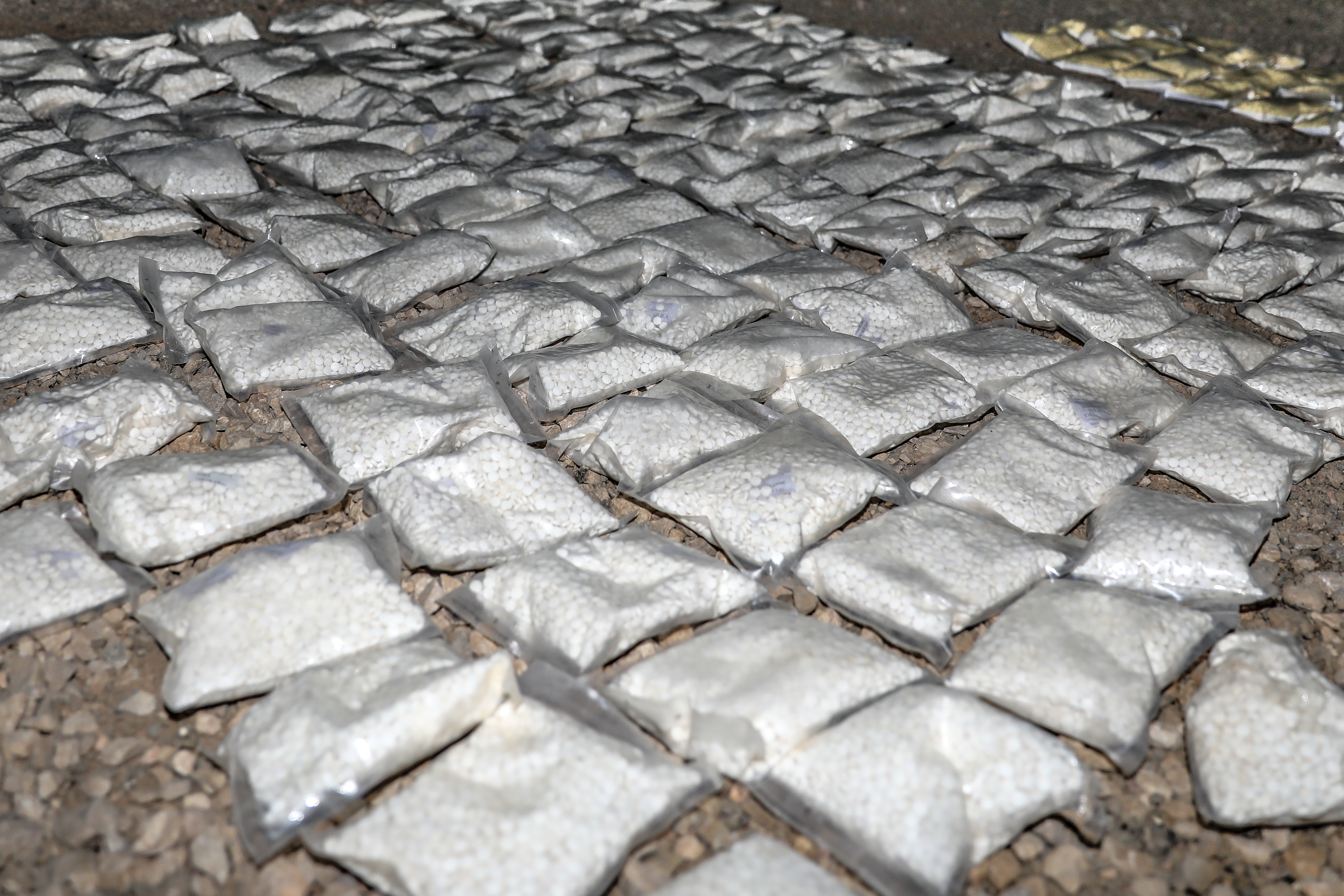
127 bags of Captagon seized in Syria before being destroyed in May 2018

The Ba'athist Syrian Captagon industry was the state-sponsored drug manufacturing and trafficking apparatus of Ba'athist Syria, which was the major responsible for the global production of the Captagon drug. Ba'athist Syria exported the drug to various countries, mainly in the Middle East region, including Jordan, Iraq, Saudi Arabia, Gulf states, and Egypt. The drug export was one of the main sources of income for the government of Bashar al-Assad, helping it to prop up the economy during the Syrian civil war.

In 2023, the UK ministry of foreign affairs estimated that Syria was responsible for about 80% of the global production of Captagon, which, according to then-secretary for the Middle East Tariq Ahmad, was exported from the port of Latakia with the assistance of the Syrian government under the command of Maher al-Assad. The same report issued by the UK government also suggested that "independent experts estimate [the Captagon trade market] could be worth up to $57 billion", and added that "it is worth approximately 3 times the combined trade of the Mexican cartels." Syria analyst and Century International fellow Sam Heller et al. challenged the credibility of the $57bn figure, which is ten times the Syrian annual budget and almost three times the country's GDP. A 2021 report by the New Lines Institute based on the retail value of annual captagon seizures estimated the drug's entire market to be worth at least $5.7bn.

Over the years, hundreds of millions of Captagon pills were smuggled into Jordan, Iraq, Saudi Arabia, and Gulf countries. One of the main smuggling routes was through the Anbar province, which borders Syria, Jordan, and Saudi Arabia. In 2021, more than 250 million Captagon pills were seized worldwide, 18 times more than the number of pills seized in 2017. Additionally, according to Al Jazeera, in 2022, Jordan seized 65 million Captagon pills in Syria en route to its territory. In 2015, the Secretary of Saudi Arabia's National Committee for Drug Control reported that the majority of Captagon consumers are aged 12 to 22.

After the fall of the Assad regime the new Syrian transitional government ordered the cessation of the drug trade; the flow had reportedly reduced by at least 90% shortly after Assad's overthrow.

== Background ==
During the Syrian civil war, the Assad regime ramped up mass production of drugs within Syria, including fenethylline, commonly referred to as "Captain Courage" by officers who distributed it to their troops. Since at least 2006, Syria had been a significant producer of fenethylline, with several shipments—each containing millions of pills or tonnes of amphetamines—seized in various countries. According to estimates based on official data from a 2022 AFP investigation, captagon surpassed all of the country's other legal exports combined.

== Exports ==
One of the largest drug seizures occurred in a Palermo port in July 2020, when the Italian police seized more than 84 million Captogen tablets worth a billion dollars, shipped from the Syrian port of Latakia, leading to international outcry. The case was tied to Camorra Mafia, a crime syndicate based in Naples.

The New York Times reported in December 2021 that the 4th Armoured Division, commanded by Maher al-Assad, oversees much of the production and distribution of Captagon, among other drugs, reinforcing Syria's status as a narco-state on the Mediterranean Sea. The unit controls manufacturing facilities, packing plants, and smuggling networks all across Syria (which have started to also move crystal meth). The division's security bureau, headed by Maj. Gen. Ghassan Bilal, provides protection for factories and along smuggling routes to the port city Latakia and to border crossings with Jordan and Lebanon. The captagon industry is also supported by the Iran-backed Shia fundamentalist group Hezbollah.

$5.7 billion worth of Captagon exports from Syria were seized across the world in 2021. Southern Europe, North Africa, Turkey and the Gulf States are the major destinations of Syria's drug exports. Police officers and security experts calculate that seized captagon constitute merely around 5-10% of total exports originating from Syria in 2021, indicating the presence of a thriving drug industry worth at least 57 billion dollars, an amount ten times greater than the regime's yearly budget.

In January 2022, the Jordanian military killed 27 drug smugglers who attempted to infiltrate via the Syrian border. 17,000 packets of hashish and 17 million Captagon pills were busted during the first quarter of 2022, a figure much higher than during the whole of 2021. Sources from the Jordanian army revealed that the drug trade is financed by a well-funded network of armed militias. In May 2022, the Jordanian government accused Iran of launching a "drug war" against the country, through its Khomeinist proxy militias based in Syria's southern regions. Officials in the Jordanian army described the rise in drug smuggling as part of an "undeclared war" waged to subvert "families, morals and values".

In March 2022, international drug lord Bruno Carbone, leader of the Camorra syndicate, was captured by the Syrian Salvation Government and extradited to Italy by November.

In May 2023, Jordanian airforce launched its first ever airstrikes targeting a building in Shuaib village of As-Suwayda Governorate, killing Marai al-Ramthan, a major drug kingpin in the country who co-ordinated the captagon trafficiking operations. Another round of air attacks struck a major drug factory in the Daraa Governorate. In June 2024, Jordan thwarted two smuggling attempts, seizing a total of 9.5 million Captagon pills, including 3.1 million pills were intercepted at the Al Omari border crossing with Saudi Arabia, while an additional 1.5 million pills and 143 kg of hashish were seized in the northern city of Ar-Ramtha at the Syrian borders.

In May 2023, a summit was held in Jeddah where the Arab League countries reached an agreement on normalization with Syria and lifting the embargo on it following the civil war in Syria, in exchange for suppressing Captagon smuggling from it to other countries in the region, which leads to increased drug consumption among young people, in turn leading to severe damage.

In January 2024, Syria allowed Jordan to attack drug smugglers within its territory several times, who were smuggling drugs to Jordan. The attacks focused mainly on the As-Suwayda Governorate in southwestern Syria. In some cases, civilians were killed in the attacks, which raised local criticism of the government for not doing enough to stop the smuggling phenomenon and forcing Jordan to take military action there.

== Post-Assad regime findings ==
Following the fall of the regime in December 2024, Captagon factories were discovered by rebel forces in various areas across Syria, especially in regions controlled by the Assad regime, including areas like Mezzeh Air Base, Douma, Al-Dimas and Yaafour, along the borders with Lebanon. Some of these facilities are reportedly operated by regime-affiliated militias and military units. Subsequently, the Syrian transitional government burned 1 million Captagon pills discovered in a security compound previously controlled by Assad's forces in the Kafr Sousa district of the capital. Further discoveries were made in Al-Sabboura and Latakia in January 2025, where authorities dismantled additional production sites and seized large shipments intended for export.

Additional large-scale seizures followed in March 2025, with two major Captagon busts reported in Syria at the Jordanian border and Saudi Arabia, disrupting key trafficking networks linked to the remnants of the Assad-era supply chain. In a separate operation, Iraqi authorities seized one tonne of Captagon smuggled from Syria via Turkey, highlighting the continued regional impact of the trade and the challenges in eradicating its networks.

In May and June 2025, the Jordanian Armed Forces thwarted major attempts to smuggle narcotics—primarily Captagon—across the border from Syria. In May, Jordanian troops engaged smugglers deep into Syrian territory, successfully seizing a large quantity of drugs, which were then handed over to civilian authorities. The following month, another large-scale smuggling operation was intercepted. Jordanian Border Guard units, working in coordination with military security agencies and the Anti-Narcotics Department, detected the infiltration. The rapid deployment of reaction patrols forced the traffickers to retreat back into Syria, and further search operations yielded substantial drug hauls that were again transferred to the proper authorities.

In early June 2025, Interior Minister Anas Khattab announced that all known Captagon production facilities across Syria had been dismantled, emphasizing the transitional government's commitment to ending the country's role as a narco-state. However, the UN Office on Drugs and Crime (UNODC) warned that Syria remained a major hub for Captagon production and trafficking, citing concerns that stocks may still be circulating and production could be shifting to new locations such as Libya. Later that month, Syrian security forces seized approximately 3 million Captagon pills and 50 kilograms of hashish following an armed confrontation with smugglers in Al-Jarajir region near the Lebanese border. In the meantime, 1.7 million Captagon pills were seized in eastern Daraa Governorate, packed and prepared for smuggling. In July, the Lebanese Army announced that it had dismantled one of the largest manufacturing plants for Captagon pills in eastern Lebanon, near the Syrian border. In October of that year, officials confiscated 11 million Captagon pills from a car entering southern Homs from Lebanon.

In January 2026, Syria's Narcotics Department, working with Iraq's General Directorate for Narcotics and Psychotropic Substances Affairs, conducted a joint security operation targeting an international drug trafficking network, resulting in the seizure of approximately 2.5 million Captagon pills and several arrests in both countries. In early February 2026, Syrian authorities, again in coordination with Iraqi counterparts, announced the seizure of about 300,000 Captagon tablets in Homs governorate and the arrest of two suspects, one of whom was wanted internationally for drug trafficking. Later that month, cooperation between Iraqi and Syrian authorities led to the confiscation of 400,000 pills in Homs province that were about to be exported.

== See also ==
- Drug economy in Lebanon
