= Lodenafil =

Chemical compound

Clinical data
- Trade names: Helleva
- Pregnancy category: Not for use in women
- Routes of administration: By mouth

Legal status
- Legal status: In general: unscheduled

Identifiers
- IUPAC name: 5-(2-Ethoxy-5-{[4-(2-hydroxyethyl)-1-piperazinyl]sulfonyl}phenyl)-1-methyl-3-propyl-1,4-dihydro-7H-pyrazolo[4,3-d]pyrimidin-7-one
- CAS Number: 398507-55-6
- PubChem CID: 4742795
- ChemSpider: 3929995
- UNII: 29X84F932D
- CompTox Dashboard (EPA): DTXSID70192906

Chemical and physical data
- Formula: C_{23}H_{32}N_{6}O_{5}S
- Molar mass: 504.61 g·mol^{−1}
- 3D model (JSmol): Interactive image
- SMILES: CCCc1c2c(c(=O)nc([nH]2)c3cc(ccc3OCC)S(=O)(=O)N4CCN(CC4)CCO)n(n1)C
- InChI: InChI=1S/C23H32N6O5S/c1-4-6-18-20-21(27(3)26-18)23(31)25-22(24-20)17-15-16(7-8-19(17)34-5-2)35(32,33)29-11-9-28(10-12-29)13-14-30/h7-8,15,30H,4-6,9-14H2,1-3H3,(H,24,25,31); Key:NEYKRKVLEWKOBI-UHFFFAOYSA-N

Lodenafil carbonate

Lodenafil (also known as hydroxyhomosildenafil, trade name Helleva) is a drug belonging to a class of drugs called PDE5 inhibitors, which many other erectile dysfunction drugs such as sildenafil, tadalafil, and vardenafil also belong to. Like udenafil and avanafil, it belongs to a new generation of PDE5 inhibitors.

Lodenafil is formulated as a prodrug in the form of the carbonate ester dimer, lodenafil carbonate, which breaks down in the body to form two molecules of the active drug lodenafil. This formulation has higher oral bioavailability than the parent drug.

It is manufactured by Cristália Produtos Químicos e Farmacêuticos in Brazil and sold there under the brand-name Helleva.

It has undergone Phase III clinical trials, but is not yet approved for use in the United States by the U.S. Food and Drug Administration.

== See also ==
- Homosildenafil
