= Thioquinapiperifil =

Identifiers
- IUPAC name: 3-ethyl-8-[[2-[4-(hydroxymethyl)piperidin-1-yl]phenyl]methylamino]-1H-imidazo[4,5-g]quinazoline-2-thione
- CAS Number: 220060-39-9
- PubChem CID: 9828076
- CompTox Dashboard (EPA): DTXSID30431383

Chemical and physical data
- Formula: C_{24}H_{28}N_{6}OS
- Molar mass: 448.59 g·mol^{−1}
- 3D model (JSmol): Interactive image
- SMILES: CCN1C2=C(C=C3C(=C2)N=CN=C3NCC4=CC=CC=C4N5CCC(CC5)CO)NC1=S
- InChI: InChI=1S/C24H28N6OS/c1-2-30-22-12-19-18(11-20(22)28-24(30)32)23(27-15-26-19)25-13-17-5-3-4-6-21(17)29-9-7-16(14-31)8-10-29/h3-6,11-12,15-16,31H,2,7-10,13-14H2,1H3,(H,28,32)(H,25,26,27); Key:NMKUPEWPVORTPC-UHFFFAOYSA-N

Thioquinapiperifil (also known as KF31327) is a synthetic drug which acts as a phosphodiesterase inhibitor, selective for the PDE5 subtype. It was synthesised as a potential treatment for disorders susceptible to treatment with PDE5 inhibitors such as erectile dysfunction, but was never developed for medical use. Subsequently it has been identified as an undisclosed ingredient in supposedly natural supplements for sexual enhancement, making it one of the few examples of a designer PDE5 inhibitor which is not a close analogue derived from either sildenafil, tadalafil or vardenafil.

== See also ==
- Acetildenafil
- Xanthoanthrafil
- Discovery and development of phosphodiesterase 5 inhibitors
