= Udenafil =

Chemical compound

Clinical data
- Routes of administration: By mouth
- ATC code: G04BE11 (WHO)

Legal status
- Legal status: US: Not approved; In general: ℞ (Prescription only)

Pharmacokinetic data
- Protein binding: 93,9%
- Metabolism: Liver (mainly CYP3A4)
- Elimination half-life: 7.3–12.1 hours
- Excretion: Biliary

Identifiers
- IUPAC name: 3-(1-Methyl-7-oxo-3-propyl-4,7-dihydro-1H-pyrazolo[4,3-d]pyrimidin-5-yl)-N-[2-(1-methylpyrrolidin-2-yl)ethyl]-4-propoxybenzenesulfonamide
- CAS Number: 268203-93-6
- PubChem CID: 6918523
- DrugBank: DB06267
- ChemSpider: 5293720
- UNII: L5IB4XLY36
- KEGG: D10027
- CompTox Dashboard (EPA): DTXSID00870301

Chemical and physical data
- Formula: C_{25}H_{36}N_{6}O_{4}S
- Molar mass: 516.66 g·mol^{−1}
- 3D model (JSmol): Interactive image
- SMILES: O=C2\N=C(/Nc1c(nn(c12)C)CCC)c3cc(ccc3OCCC)S(=O)(=O)NCCC4N(C)CCC4
- InChI: InChI=1S/C25H36N6O4S/c1-5-8-20-22-23(31(4)29-20)25(32)28-24(27-22)19-16-18(10-11-21(19)35-15-6-2)36(33,34)26-13-12-17-9-7-14-30(17)3/h10-11,16-17,26H,5-9,12-15H2,1-4H3,(H,27,28,32); Key:IYFNEFQTYQPVOC-UHFFFAOYSA-N

The drug udenafil is marketed under the trade name Zydena. It is within the PDE_{5} inhibitor class (which also includes avanafil, sildenafil, tadalafil, and vardenafil). Like other PDE_{5} inhibitors, it is used to treat erectile dysfunction. Udenafil was developed by Dong-A Pharmaceutical. It has fairly rapid onset of action (peak plasma concentration after 1 to 1.5 hours), and has long duration of action (plasma half-life of 11 to 13 hours). Udenafil's pharmacokinetics allows once-daily dosage (in addition to on-demand use). Typical doses are 100 and 200 mg. Udenafil is available in Korea, Russia, and the Philippines. It has not yet been approved for use in the United States by the U.S. Food and Drug Administration.
