= Gisadenafil =

Identifiers
- IUPAC name: 5-[2-ethoxy-5-(4-ethylpiperazin-1-yl)sulfonyl-3-pyridinyl]-3-ethyl-2-(2-methoxyethyl)-6H-pyrazolo[4,3-d]pyrimidin-7-one
- CAS Number: 334826-98-1
- PubChem CID: 135536943
- CompTox Dashboard (EPA): DTXSID00955107

Chemical and physical data
- Formula: C_{23}H_{33}N_{7}O_{5}S
- Molar mass: 519.62 g·mol^{−1}
- 3D model (JSmol): Interactive image
- SMILES: COCCn1nc2C(=O)NC(=Nc2c1CC)c1cc(cnc1OCC)S(=O)(=O)N1CCN(CC1)CC
- InChI: InChI=1S/C23H33N7O5S/c1-5-18-19-20(27-30(18)12-13-34-4)22(31)26-21(25-19)17-14-16(15-24-23(17)35-7-3)36(32,33)29-10-8-28(6-2)9-11-29/h14-15H,5-13H2,1-4H3,(H,25,26,31); Key:YPFZMBHKIVDSNR-UHFFFAOYSA-N

Gisadenafil (UK-369,003) is a synthetic drug which acts as a phosphodiesterase inhibitor, selective for the PDE5 subtype.

== See also ==
- Sildenafil
- Vardenafil
- Discovery and development of phosphodiesterase 5 inhibitors
