= T-0156 =

Names
- Preferred IUPAC name Methyl 2-[(2-methylpyridin-4-yl)methyl]-1-oxo-8-[(pyrimidin-2-yl)methoxy]-4-(3,4,5-trimethoxyphenyl)-1,2-dihydro-2,7-naphthyridine-3-carboxylate
- Other names T0156

Identifiers
CAS Number	324572-93-2
3D model (JSmol)	Interactive image; (HCl): Interactive image
ChEBI	CHEBI:93111
ChEMBL	ChEMBL1190161; (HCl): ChEMBL540294
ChemSpider	5175; (HCl): 8027754
IUPHAR/BPS	5275
PubChem CID	5368; (HCl): 9852041
CompTox Dashboard (EPA)	DTXSID701045745
- InChI: InChI=1S/C31H29N5O7/c1-18-13-19(7-11-32-18)16-36-27(31(38)42-5)25(20-14-22(39-2)28(41-4)23(15-20)40-3)21-8-12-35-29(26(21)30(36)37)43-17-24-33-9-6-10-34-24/h6-15H,16-17H2,1-5H3 Key: JEMJAABFSYOLAP-UHFFFAOYSA-N; (HCl): InChI=1S/C31H29N5O7.ClH/c1-18-13-19(7-11-32-18)16-36-27(31(38)42-5)25(20-14-22(39-2)28(41-4)23(15-20)40-3)21-8-12-35-29(26(21)30(36)37)43-17-24-33-9-6-10-34-24;/h6-15H,16-17H2,1-5H3;1H Key: RBJCBXAXUHCWBR-UHFFFAOYSA-N
- SMILES: CC1=NC=CC(=C1)CN2C(=C(C3=C(C2=O)C(=NC=C3)OCC4=NC=CC=N4)C5=CC(=C(C(=C5)OC)OC)OC)C(=O)OC; (HCl): CC1=NC=CC(=C1)CN2C(=C(C3=C(C2=O)C(=NC=C3)OCC4=NC=CC=N4)C5=CC(=C(C(=C5)OC)OC)OC)C(=O)OC.Cl

Properties
Chemical formula	C_{31}H_{29}N_{5}O_{7}
Molar mass	583.601 g·mol^{−1}
- Except where otherwise noted, data are given for materials in their standard state (at 25 °C [77 °F], 100 kPa). Infobox references

T-0156 is a phosphodiesterase 5 inhibitor.
