= Benzamidenafil =

Names
- Preferred IUPAC name N-[(3,4-Dimethoxyphenyl)methyl]-2-[(1-hydroxypropan-2-yl)amino]-5-nitrobenzamide
- Other names Xanthoanthrafil

Identifiers
CAS Number	1020251-53-9
3D model (JSmol)	Interactive image
ChemSpider	8286399
MeSH	C442640
PubChem CID	10110873
UNII	B6ZMZ878RF
CompTox Dashboard (EPA)	DTXSID501031839
- InChI: InChI=1S/C19H23N3O6/c1-12(11-23)21-16-6-5-14(22(25)26)9-15(16)19(24)20-10-13-4-7-17(27-2)18(8-13)28-3/h4-9,12,21,23H,10-11H2,1-3H3,(H,20,24) Key: ZISFCTXLAXIEMV-UHFFFAOYSA-N; InChI=1/C19H23N3O6/c1-12(11-23)21-16-6-5-14(22(25)26)9-15(16)19(24)20-10-13-4-7-17(27-2)18(8-13)28-3/h4-9,12,21,23H,10-11H2,1-3H3,(H,20,24) Key: ZISFCTXLAXIEMV-UHFFFAOYAW
- SMILES: COC1=C(OC)C=C(CNC(=O)C2=CC(=CC=C2NC(C)CO)[N+]([O-])=O)C=C1

Properties
Chemical formula	C_{19}H_{23}N_{3}O_{6}
Molar mass	389.408 g·mol^{−1}
- Except where otherwise noted, data are given for materials in their standard state (at 25 °C [77 °F], 100 kPa). Infobox references

Benzamidenafil (Xanthoanthrafil) is a synthetic drug that acts as a PDE5 inhibitor. It has the same mechanism of action as pharmaceutical drugs used to treat erectile dysfunction, but it is not approved by any regulatory agency for such use. The (R) enantiomer is the active form, and was previously patented under the code FR226807. It has also been used for research into other potential therapeutic applications of PDE5 inhibitors such as in the treatment of nephrotoxicity.

The drug has been found as an undeclared adulterant in supposedly "natural" health supplements. In 2009, the supplement manufacturer Hi-Tech Pharmaceuticals recalled its product Stamina-Rx because it was adulterated with benzamidenafil.

== See also ==
- Acetildenafil
- Homosildenafil
