= CGMP-specific phosphodiesterase type 5 =

Mammalian protein found in humans

PDE5A
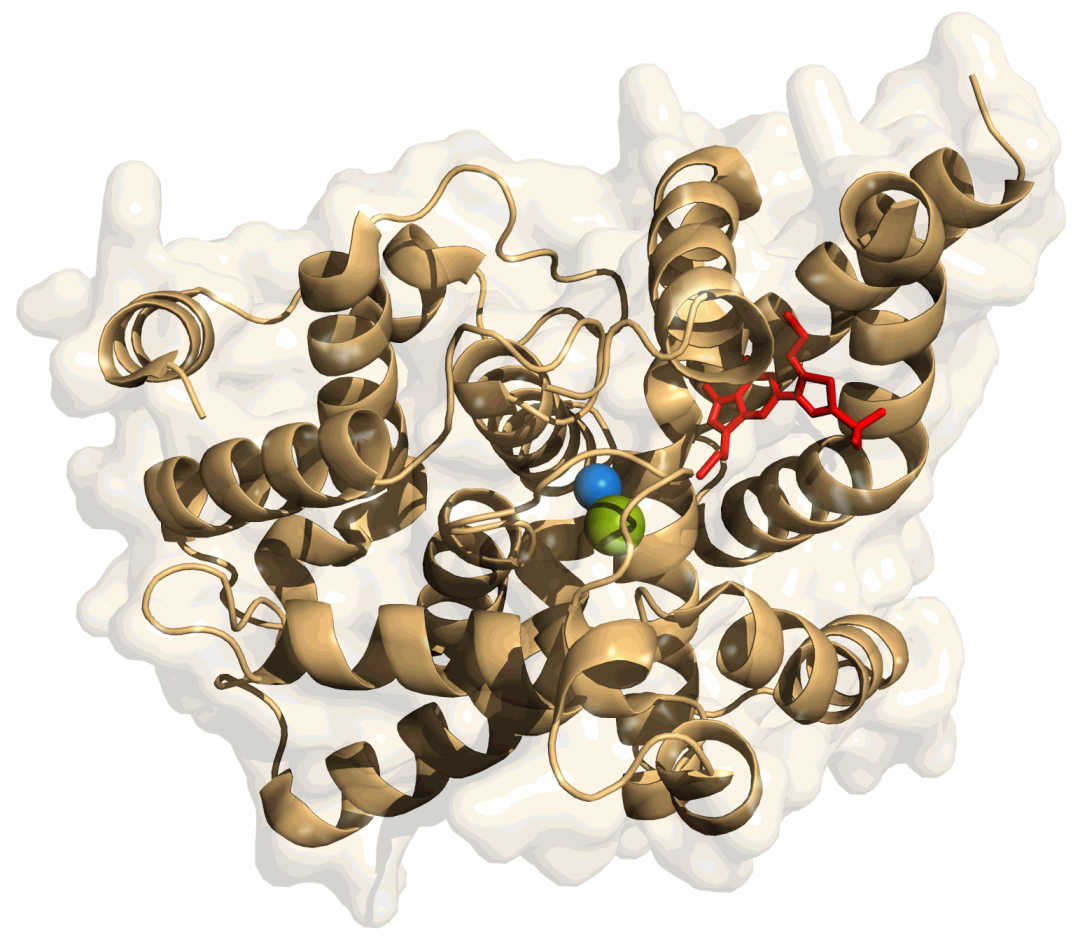

Identifiers
- Aliases: PDE5A, CGB-PDE, CN5A, PDE5, phosphodiesterase 5A
- External IDs: OMIM: 603310; MGI: 2651499; GeneCards: PDE5A
Available structures
PDB	Ortholog search: PDBe RCSB
PDB	List of PDB id codes 4OEX, 1RKP, 1T9R, 1T9S, 1TBF, 1UDT, 1UDU, 1UHO, 1XOZ, 1XP0, 2CHM, 2H40, 2H42, 2H44, 2XSS, 3B2R, 3BJC, 3HC8, 3HDZ, 3JWQ, 3JWR, 3LFV, 3MF0, 3SHY, 3SHZ, 3SIE, 3TGE, 3TGG, 4G2W, 4G2Y, 4I9Z, 4IA0, 4MD6, 4OEW
Enzyme activity
EC #	BRENDA	ExPASy	KEGG	MetaCyc
3.1.4.35	↗	↗	↗	↗

Gene location (Human)
Chr.	Chromosome 4 (human)
Band	4q26	Start	119,494,397 bp
Band	4q26	End	119,628,804 bp

Gene location (Mouse)
Chr.	Chromosome 3 (mouse)
Band	3|3 G1	Start	122,522,596 bp
Band	3|3 G1	End	122,653,023 bp
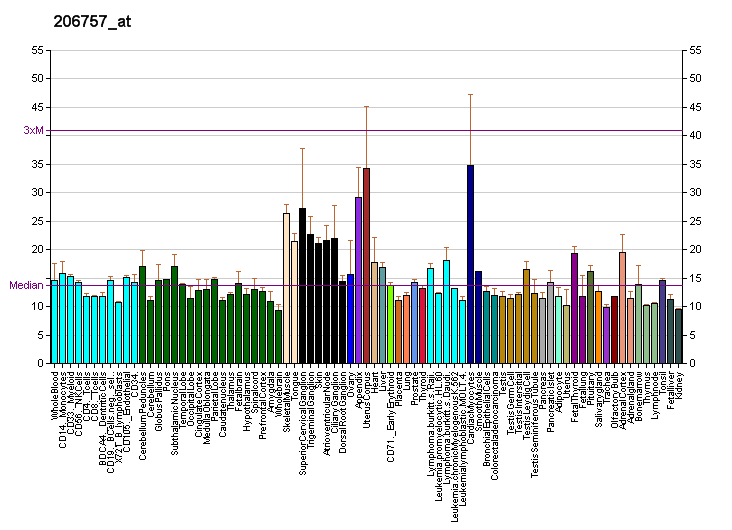
RNA expression pattern
Bgee	Human / Mouse (ortholog); Top expressed in: Achilles tendon; Descending thoracic aorta; epithelium of colon; tail of epididymis; ascending aorta; right coronary artery; popliteal artery; tibial arteries; gastric mucosa; caput epididymis / Top expressed in: left lung lobe; left colon; cervix; ciliary body; islet of Langerhans; right lung; ascending aorta; Gonadal ridge; ileum; migratory enteric neural crest cell; More reference expression data
BioGPS	More reference expression data
Gene ontology
Molecular function	nucleotide binding; 3',5'-cyclic-nucleotide phosphodiesterase activity; cGMP binding; metal ion binding; cyclic-nucleotide phosphodiesterase activity; catalytic activity; phosphoric diester hydrolase activity; hydrolase activity; 3',5'-cyclic-GMP phosphodiesterase activity; protein binding
Cellular component	cytosol; cellular component
Biological process	positive regulation of MAP kinase activity; cGMP metabolic process; positive regulation of cardiac muscle hypertrophy; cGMP catabolic process; negative regulation of T cell proliferation; positive regulation of oocyte development; metabolism; relaxation of cardiac muscle; signal transduction; negative regulation of cardiac muscle contraction; regulation of nitric oxide mediated signal transduction
Sources:Amigo / QuickGO
Orthologs
Databases	NCBI: entry; OMA: entry
Species	Human	Mouse
Entrez	8654	242202
Ensembl	ENSG00000138735	ENSMUSG00000053965
UniProt	O76074	Q8CG03
RefSeq (mRNA)	NM_033437; NM_001083; NM_033430	NM_153422
RefSeq (protein)	NP_001074; NP_236914; NP_246273	NP_700471
Location (UCSC)	Chr 4: 119.49 – 119.63 Mb	Chr 3: 122.52 – 122.65 Mb
PubMed search
- Wikidata
View/Edit Human	View/Edit Mouse

Cyclic guanosine monophosphate-specific phosphodiesterase type 5 is an enzyme (EC 3.1.4.17) from the phosphodiesterase class. It is found in various tissues, most prominently the corpus cavernosum of the clitoris and of the penis as well as the retina. It has also been recently discovered to play a vital role in the cardiovascular system.

The phosphodiesterase (PDE) isozymes, found in several tissues including the rod and cone photoreceptor cells of the retina, belong to a large family of cyclic nucleotide PDEs that catalyze cAMP and cGMP hydrolysis.

The interest in PDEs as molecular targets of drug action has grown with the development of isozyme-selective PDE inhibitors that offer potent inhibition of selected isozymes without the side-effects attributed to nonselective inhibitors such as theophylline.

Sildenafil, vardenafil, tadalafil, and avanafil are PDE5 inhibitors that are significantly more potent and selective than zaprinast and other early PDE5 inhibitors.

== Action of PDE5 ==
PDE5 is an enzyme that accepts cGMP and breaks it down. Sildenafil, vardenafil and tadalafil are inhibitors of this enzyme, which bind to the catalytic site of PDE5. Both inhibitors bind with high affinity and specificity, and cGMP-binding to the allosteric sites stimulates binding of PDE5 inhibitors at the catalytic site. The kinetics of inhibitor binding and inhibition of catalysis imply the existence of two PDE5 conformers, and results of native gel electrophoresis reveal that PDE5 exists in two apparently distinct conformations, i.e., an extended conformer and a more compact conformer.

PDE5 activity is modulated by a rapidly reversible redox switch. Chemical reduction of PDE5 relieves autoinhibition of enzyme functions; allosteric cGMP-binding activity is increased 10-fold, and catalytic activity is increased ~3-fold. The redox effect on allosteric cGMP-binding occurs in the isolated regulatory domain. A change in the state of reduction of PDE5 or the isolated regulatory domain is associated with an apparent conformational change similar to that caused by phosphorylation.

== Tissue distribution of PDE5 ==
PDE5 is expressed in human colonic cells and in intestinal tissue and its activity is regulated by intracellular cGMP levels in these cells that increase on GCC activation. This presumably occurs through binding of cGMP to the GAF domains in the N-terminus of PDE5, resulting in allosteric activation of the enzyme.

The mechanism of action of E4021 on both the nonactivated and activated forms of rod PDE6 because both states are relevant to understanding how PDE5-selective inhibitors may alter signal transduction pathways in photoreceptor cells. PDE5-selective inhibitors may show good discrimination of PDE5 from most other PDE isoforms.

In addition to human corpus cavernosum smooth muscle, PDE5 is also found in lower concentrations in other tissues including platelets, vascular and visceral smooth muscle, and skeletal muscle. The inhibition of PDE5 in these tissues by sildenafil may be the basis for the enhanced platelet antiaggregatory activity of nitric oxide observed in vitro, an inhibition of platelet thrombus formation in vivo and peripheral arterial-venous dilatation in vivo.

Immunohistology has shown that PDE5 localizes in heart cells at the sarcomere z-disk, but can also be found in diffuse amounts in the cytosol. Increased expression of PDE5 has also been measured in hypertrophic disease and has been linked to oxidative stress, and PDE5 inhibition has shown beneficial effects in the failing heart. In an experiment, PDE5 overexpression was found to contribute to worsened pathological remodeling after mouse cardiomyocytes experienced myocardial infarction. The role of PDE5 in heart failure and cardiac treatment involving PDE5 inhibitors have been major areas of focus for both lab and clinical studies.

PDE5 inhibitors have also been investigated as supportive therapy in advanced heart failure. A case report described the use of a PDE5 inhibitor in combination with "MitraClip" therapy as a bridge to cardiac transplantation. In a reported patient with severe mitral regurgitation and elevated pulmonary artery pressure, the approach helped reduce pulmonary hypertension and optimized the patient's cardiac function prior to surgery.

== PDE5-inhibiting drugs ==
The most commonly available PDE5 inhibitors are sildenafil (Viagra), vardenafil (Levitra), tadalafil (Cialis), and avanafil (Stendra).

PDE5 inhibitors are not routinely prescribed as first line treatment for erectile dysfunction. This is because they can cause unwanted side effects like hair loss. headache, and nausea (among others). Often, erectile dysfunction can instead be treated non-pharmacologically, by identifying and addressing a psychogenic cause of the disease.

Particular caution should be used when prescribing PDE5 inhibitors for erectile dysfunction for patients receiving protease inhibitors, like Atazanavir, which are used to treat HIV. Coadministration of a protease inhibitor with a PDE5 inhibitor is expected to substantially increase the PDE5 inhibitor concentration and may result in an increase in PDE5 inhibitor-associated adverse events, including hypotension, visual changes, and priapism.

PDE5 inhibitor drugs are effective in men regardless of why they have erectile dysfunction — including vascular disease, nerve problems, and even psychological causes. PDE5-inhibiting drugs can cause a number of side-effects, including headache, lightheadedness, dizziness, flushing, nasal congestion, and changes in vision.

=== Sildenafil ===
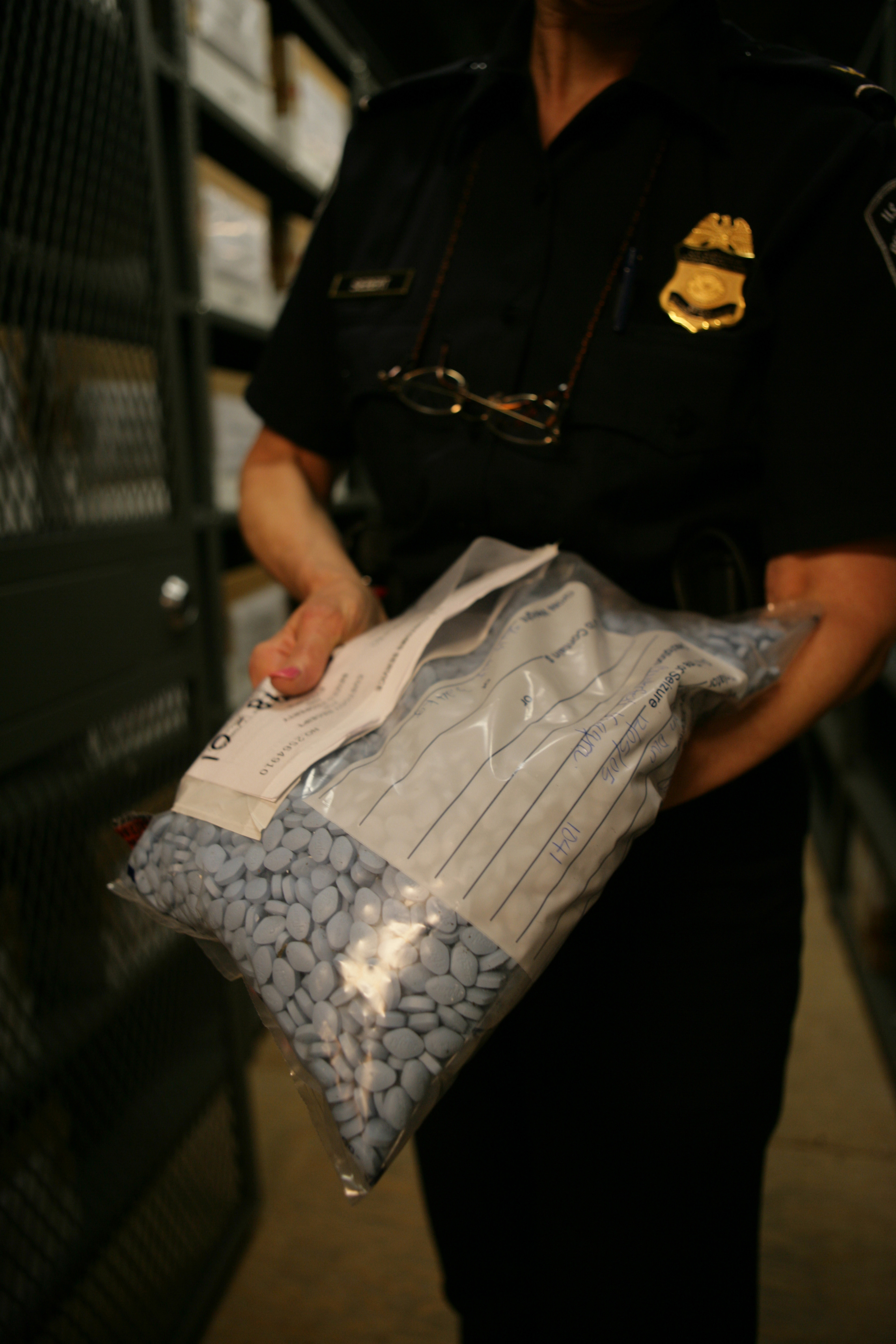
Bulk bag of counterfeit Viagra

Sildenafil (marketed as Viagra) was the first PDE5 inhibitor on the market. Originally created as a treatment for high blood pressure in 1989, it was found to have a secondary use as an effective PDE5 inhibitor, enabling men who use it to gain stronger erections after arousal. The FDA approved Viagra on March 27, 1998. Discovered by Pfizer, sildenafil is a potent and selective inhibitor of cGMP-specific phosphodiesterase type 5 (PDE5), which is responsible for degradation of cGMP in the corpus cavernosum in the penis. This means that, when sildenafil is present in the organism, normal sexual stimulation leads to increased levels of cGMP in the corpus cavernosum, which leads to better erections. Without sexual stimulation and no activation of the NO/cGMP system, sildenafil should not cause an erection.

Studies in vitro have shown that sildenafil is selective for PDE5. Its effect is more potent on PDE5 than on other known phosphodiesterases (10-fold for PDE6, >80-fold for PDE1, >700-fold for PDE2, PDE3, PDE4, PDE7, PDE8, PDE9, PDE10, and PDE11). The approximately 4,000-fold selectivity for PDE5 versus PDE3 is important because PDE3 is involved in control of cardiac contractility. Sildenafil is only about 10-fold as potent for PDE5 compared to PDE6, an enzyme found in the retina that is involved in the phototransduction pathway of the retina. This lower selectivity is thought to be the basis for abnormalities related to color vision observed with higher doses or plasma levels.

Genetic differences in the PDE5A gene may affect individual responses to PDE5 inhibitors. In a clinical study of hypertensive men with erectile dysfunction, those carrying a specific promoter polymorphism (the c allele) experienced a greater blood pressure, which resulted in a lowering of effect from sildenafil compared to those with the T allele. This suggests that genetic variation could influence both the efficacy and cardiovascular impact of PDE5 inhibitor therapy.

=== Vardenafil ===
Vardenafil (marketed as Levitra, Staxyn and Vivanza) was the second oral PDE-5 inhibitor for erectile dysfunction to be FDA approved in August 2003.

=== Tadalafil ===
Tadalafil (marketed as Cialis) is a PDE5 inhibitor used to treat erectile dysfunction and pulmonary arterial hypertension. It has a longer half life than sildenafil of 17.5 hours, allowing it to be taken once a day. Tadalafil "daily" (5 mg) is also used for treatment of benign prostate hyperplasia.

In patients with pulmonary arterial hypertension, tadalafil improves symptoms and also slows down the progressive deterioration in breathlessness seen in this condition. Studies have shown that tadalafil is more selective for PDE5 over PDE6 than sildenafil or vardenafil.

== See also ==
- PDE5 drug design
- PDE5 inhibitor
- Phosphodiesterase
- Icariin
