= Ajanta Pharma =

Indian pharmaceutical company which was established in the yea 1973

Ajanta Pharma Limited
- Type: Public
- Traded as: BSE: 532331; NSE: AJANTPHARM
- Industry: Pharmaceuticals; Drugs; Healthcare
- Founded: 1973; 53 years ago
- Headquarters: Mumbai, Maharashtra, India
- Key people: Yogesh Agrawal (Managing Director); Rajesh Agrawal (Joint Managing Director)
- Products: Branded Generic Formulations / Medicines
- Revenue: ▲₹4,648 crore (US$500 million) (2025)
- Operating income: ▲₹1,260 crore (US$130 million) (2025)
- Net income: ▲₹920 crore (US$98 million) (2025)
- Number of employees: 9,628 (March 2025)
- Subsidiaries: Ajanta Pharma Philippines Inc.; Ajanta Pharma USA Inc.; Ajanta Pharma Nigeria Ltd.
- Website: www.ajantapharma.com
- Footnotes; Financials as of 31 March 2025.

Ajanta Pharma Limited (APL) is an Indian multinational pharmaceutical company. The company operates in India, the United States, and over 30 countries across Africa, Southeast Asia, West Asia, and the CIS. It was established in 1973..

== Markets and business ==
Ajanta Pharma has over 1,400 products registered currently in various countries and an equal number of products are under approval. In India, the company is a branded generic company focused on a few high growth specialty therapies in ophthalmology, dermatology, cardiology, and pain management.

Ajanta Pharma exports products to over 30 countries in Asia and Africa. In these markets, the company serves a wide range of therapeutic products in the areas of antimalarial, cardiovascular, gastrointestinal, antibiotic, dermatology, antihistamine, multivitamin, gynecology, and pain management.

Ajanta Pharma has recently stepped up its presence in the United States with a select product portfolio, which includes niche and complex technology products. Currently, the company has 27 products in the US market.

=== History ===
In the early 2000s, Ajanta Pharma was identified as a significant contributor to foreign exchange earnings, alongside Reddy Labs, primarily through sales in Southeast Asia. In 2003, a joint venture between Ajanta Pharma and the Ministry of Health in Turkmenistan supplied approximately half of the country’s pharmaceutical requirements. The company also entered into joint ventures with regional governments in countries including Uzbekistan, Kazakhstan, Kyrygyzstan, and Tajikistan. These ventures were discontinued in the 2010s due to lack of profitability.

The company reported a significant loss in 2005 (Note: Year ending 31 March 2005) due to a decline in the value of its investments, which was reported to be four times its annual profit for that year. In the same year, Ajanta Pharma recorded sales of ₹13.56 billion, which was reported as the highest among Indian pharmaceutical companies at the time.

In 2015, the company’s stock performance over the preceding four years was noted for significant appreciation, and its inclusion in the BSE 500 index was reported. By 2019, the company was listed on the S&P BSE 200 index.

== Manufacturing facilities ==
Ajanta Pharma operates seven manufacturing facilities in India. Six facilities manufacture finished formulations, including Dahej and Paithan plants which is approved by the US FDA and Guwahati plant which caters to domestic and emerging markets. Another plant manufactures active pharmaceutical ingredients (APIs) primarily for captive consumption.

== Legal proceedings ==
Bayer (Note: Specifically Bayer Intellectual Property GMBH) filed suit before the Delhi High Court accusing Ajanta of patent infringement on the erectile dysfunction treatments vardenafil and vardenafil hydrochloride. Ajanta argued that Bayer was not using its patent in India for the benefit of India, which led the court to provide partial relief to an injunction granted to Bayer, allowing Ajanta to manufacture but not sell the product, in January 2017. Bayer and Ajanta reached an unspecified agreement after mediation was ordered by the court in February 2017.

== Notes ==
=== Patent applications in India ===
- 1998-Gazette of India, 31 October 1998, p. 1087; Gazette of India, 26 February 2000, p. 116
- 1999-Gazette of India, 18 September 1999, p. 843; Gazette of India, 4 March 2000, p. 123; Gazette of India, 20 October 2001, p. 1886
- 2000-Gazette of India, 24 June 2000, p. 477; Gazette of India, 30 June 2001, p. 867; Gazette of India, 14 October 2001, p. 975; Gazette of India, 8 June 2002, p. 1178; Gazette of India, 6 September 2003, p. 4006
- 2001-Gazette of India, 29 March 2003, p. 1200
- 2002-Gazette of India, 15 February 2003, p. 518; Gazette of India, 20 March 2004, p. 1748; Gazette of India, 29 May 2004, p. 4014

=== Products subject to price control in India ===
- Clinidipine+Metroprolol tablets-Gazette of India, Extraordinary, 21 December 2018, p. 8
- Timolol+Brinzolamide eye drops-Gazette of India, Extraordinary, 2 November 2018, p. 21
