= Simmerafil =

Chemical compound

Clinical data
- Other names: TPN171

Legal status
- Legal status: Investigational

Identifiers
- IUPAC name: N-[3-(4,5-Diethyl-6-oxo-1H-pyrimidin-2-yl)-4-propoxyphenyl]-2-(4-methylpiperazin-1-yl)acetamide
- CAS Number: 1229018-87-4
- PubChem CID: 136197286

Chemical and physical data
- Formula: C_{24}H_{35}N_{5}O_{3}
- Molar mass: 441.576 g·mol^{−1}

Simmerafil (TPN171H) is a selective PDE5 inhibitor in development for the treatment of erectile dysfunction and pulmonary hypertension.
