= Avanafil =

Chemical compound

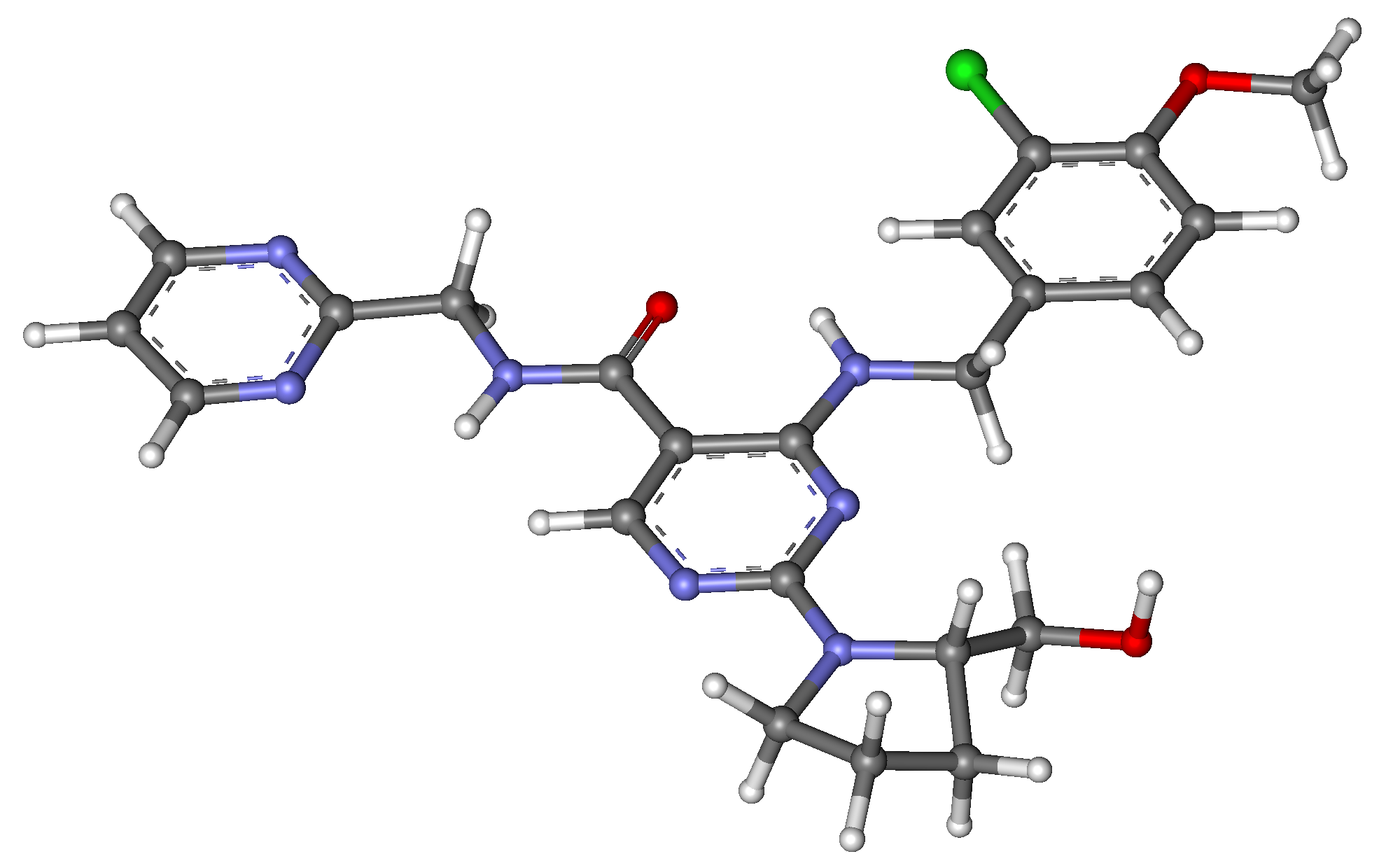
- Avanafil is a PDE5 inhibitor

Clinical data
- Trade names: Stendra
- AHFS/Drugs.com: Monograph
- MedlinePlus: a614010
- License data: EU EMA: by INN; US DailyMed: Avanafil; US FDA: Avanafil
- Routes of administration: By mouth
- ATC code: G04BE10 (WHO)

Legal status
- Legal status: AU: S4 (Prescription only); UK: POM (Prescription only); US: ℞-only; EU: Rx-only

Identifiers
- IUPAC name: (S)-4-((3-chloro-4-methoxybenzyl)amino)-2-(2-(hydroxymethyl)pyrrolidin-1-yl)-N-(pyrimidin-2-ylmethyl)pyrimidine-5-carboxamide
- CAS Number: 330784-47-9
- PubChem CID: 9869929
- IUPHAR/BPS: 7448
- DrugBank: DB06237
- ChemSpider: 8045620
- UNII: DR5S136IVO
- KEGG: D03217
- ChEBI: CHEBI:66876
- ChEMBL: ChEMBL1963681
- PDB ligand: E6L (PDBe, RCSB PDB)
- CompTox Dashboard (EPA): DTXSID50186727

Chemical and physical data
- Formula: C_{23}H_{26}ClN_{7}O_{3}
- Molar mass: 483.96 g·mol^{−1}
- 3D model (JSmol): Interactive image
- SMILES: Clc1c(OC)ccc(c1)CNc3nc(ncc3C(=O)NCc2ncccn2)N4[C@@H](CCC4)CO
- InChI: InChI=1S/C23H26ClN7O3/c1-34-19-6-5-15(10-18(19)24)11-27-21-17(22(33)28-13-20-25-7-3-8-26-20)12-29-23(30-21)31-9-2-4-16(31)14-32/h3,5-8,10,12,16,32H,2,4,9,11,13-14H2,1H3,(H,28,33)(H,27,29,30)/t16-/m0/s1; Key:WEAJZXNPAWBCOA-INIZCTEOSA-N

Avanafil is a PDE5 inhibitor approved for erectile dysfunction by the FDA on April 27, 2012 and by EMA on June 21, 2013. Avanafil is sold under the brand names Stendra and Spedra. It was invented at Mitsubishi Tanabe Pharma, formerly known as Tanabe Seiyaku Co., and licensed to Vivus Inc., which partnered with Menarini Group to commercialise Spedra in over forty European countries, Australia, and New Zealand. Metuchen Pharmaceuticals obtained exclusive rights within the United States.

Avanafil acts by inhibiting a specific phosphodiesterase type 5 enzyme found in various body tissues, primarily in the corpus cavernosum penis. Other similar drugs are sildenafil, tadalafil and vardenafil. The advantage of avanafil is that it has very fast onset of action compared with other PDE5 inhibitors. It is absorbed quickly, reaching a maximum serum concentration in about thirty to forty-five minutes. About two-thirds of the participants were able to engage in sexual activity within fifteen minutes.

== Medical use ==
Avanafil is used to treat erectile dysfunction (ED).

== Adverse effects ==
Although avanafil is generally well tolerated, dose dependent adverse effects can occur. The most common adverse effects include headache, flushing, nasopharyngitis, nasal congestion, and back pain. While it is also uncommon, there is a potential for visual disturbances to occur in patients, as well as hearing impairment.

== Mechanism of action ==
Avanafil inhibits phosphodiesterase-5, preventing the degradation of cGMP. The increased levels of cGMP causes vasodilation, resulting in an increased blood flow in the penis. Avanafil's mechanism of action takes place once nitric oxide is released, in association with sexual stimulation.

== Synthesis ==
Avanafil can be synthesized from a benzylamine derivative and a pyrimidine derivative:

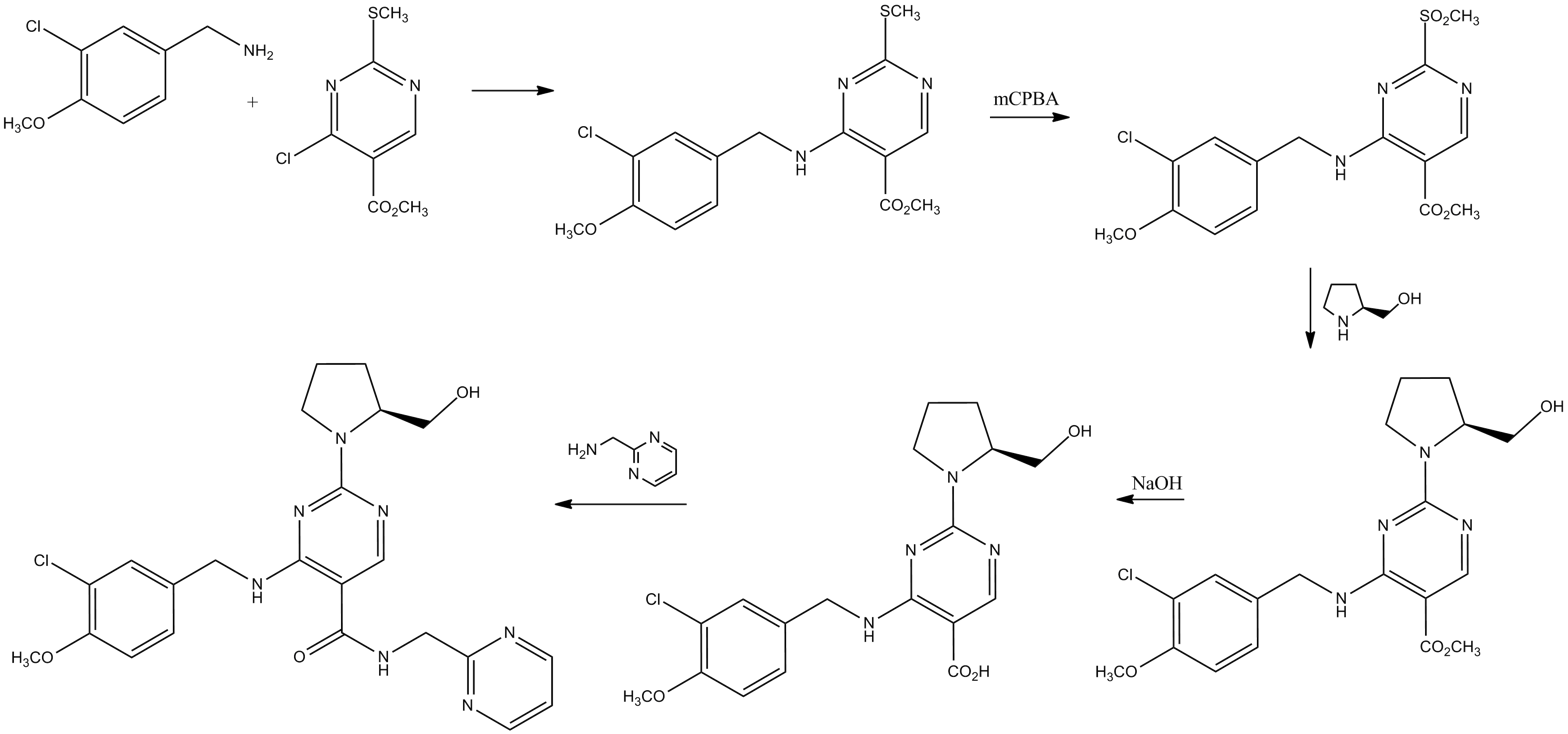
