= Mirodenafil =

Chemical compound

Clinical data
- Trade names: Mvix

Legal status
- Legal status: US: Unscheduled; not FDA-approved; Rx-only (KR)

Identifiers
- IUPAC name: 5-Ethyl-3,5-dihydro-2-[5-([4-(2-hydroxyethyl)-1-piperazinyl]sulfonyl)-2-propoxyphenyl]-7-propyl-4H-pyrrolo[3,2-d]pyrimidin-4-one
- CAS Number: 862189-95-5
- PubChem CID: 12001014
- ChemSpider: 10173481
- UNII: 504G362H0H
- ChEBI: CHEBI:136049
- CompTox Dashboard (EPA): DTXSID50881265

Chemical and physical data
- Formula: C_{26}H_{37}N_{5}O_{5}S
- Molar mass: 531.67 g·mol^{−1}
- 3D model (JSmol): Interactive image
- SMILES: CCCc1cn(CC)c2c1[nH]c(nc2=O)c1c(OCCC)ccc(c1)S(=O)(=O)N1CCN(CC1)CCO
- InChI: InChI=1S/C26H37N5O5S/c1-4-7-19-18-30(6-3)24-23(19)27-25(28-26(24)33)21-17-20(8-9-22(21)36-16-5-2)37(34,35)31-12-10-29(11-13-31)14-15-32/h8-9,17-18,32H,4-7,10-16H2,1-3H3,(H,27,28,33); Key:MIJFNYMSCFYZNY-UHFFFAOYSA-N

Mirodenafil (AR1001) is a PDE5 inhibitor used to treat erectile dysfunction. Developed by SK Chemicals Life Science, mirodenafil is marketed in Korea under the brand name Mvix, offered both as tablets (50 mg and 100 mg) and as orally dissolving films (50 mg).

Despite several clinical trials having been conducted, mirodenafil has not been approved for use in the United States by the US Food and Drug Administration. It has been repurposed as a potential treatment for Alzheimer's disease.
