= Homosildenafil =

Chemical compound

Clinical data
- ATC code: None

Identifiers
- IUPAC name: 5-[2-Ethoxy-5-(4-ethylpiperazin-1-yl)sulfonylphenyl]-1-methyl-3-propyl-4H-pyrazolo[4,3-d]pyrimidin-7-one
- CAS Number: 642928-07-2
- PubChem CID: 24756844
- ChemSpider: 22547032
- UNII: 0Z3JH0S0QK
- CompTox Dashboard (EPA): DTXSID10214510

Chemical and physical data
- Formula: C_{23}H_{32}N_{6}O_{4}S
- Molar mass: 488.61 g·mol^{−1}
- 3D model (JSmol): Interactive image
- SMILES: CCCC1=NN(C)C2=C1N=C(NC2=O)C1=CC(=CC=C1OCC)S(=O)(=O)N1CCN(CC)CC1
- InChI: InChI=1S/C23H32N6O4S/c1-5-8-18-20-21(27(4)26-18)23(30)25-22(24-20)17-15-16(9-10-19(17)33-7-3)34(31,32)29-13-11-28(6-2)12-14-29/h9-10,15H,5-8,11-14H2,1-4H3,(H,24,25,30); Key:MJEXYQIZUOHDGY-UHFFFAOYSA-N

Homosildenafil (also known as methyl-sildenafil) is a synthetic drug which acts as a phosphodiesterase inhibitor. It is an analog of sildenafil and vardenafil. Homosildenafil was first identified as an adulterant in sex enhancement products in 2003 and was more recently detected in dietary supplements.

Homosildenafil has 35% the PDE5 inhibition activity of sildenafil itself with similar selectivity.

Sildenafil is mainly metabolized by the microsomal isozymes CYP3A4 with secondary metabolism by CYP2C9. The major active metabolite is N-desmethylsildenafil. The plasma level of the equivalent homosildenafil metabolite reaches 40% of sildenafil's bioavailability. The N-desmethyl metabolite is further metabolized, with a half-life of 4 hours.

== See also ==
- Aildenafil
- Nitrosoprodenafil
- Sulfoaildenafil
- Hydroxythiohomosildenafil
