= Tadalafil =

Medication used to treat erectile dysfunction

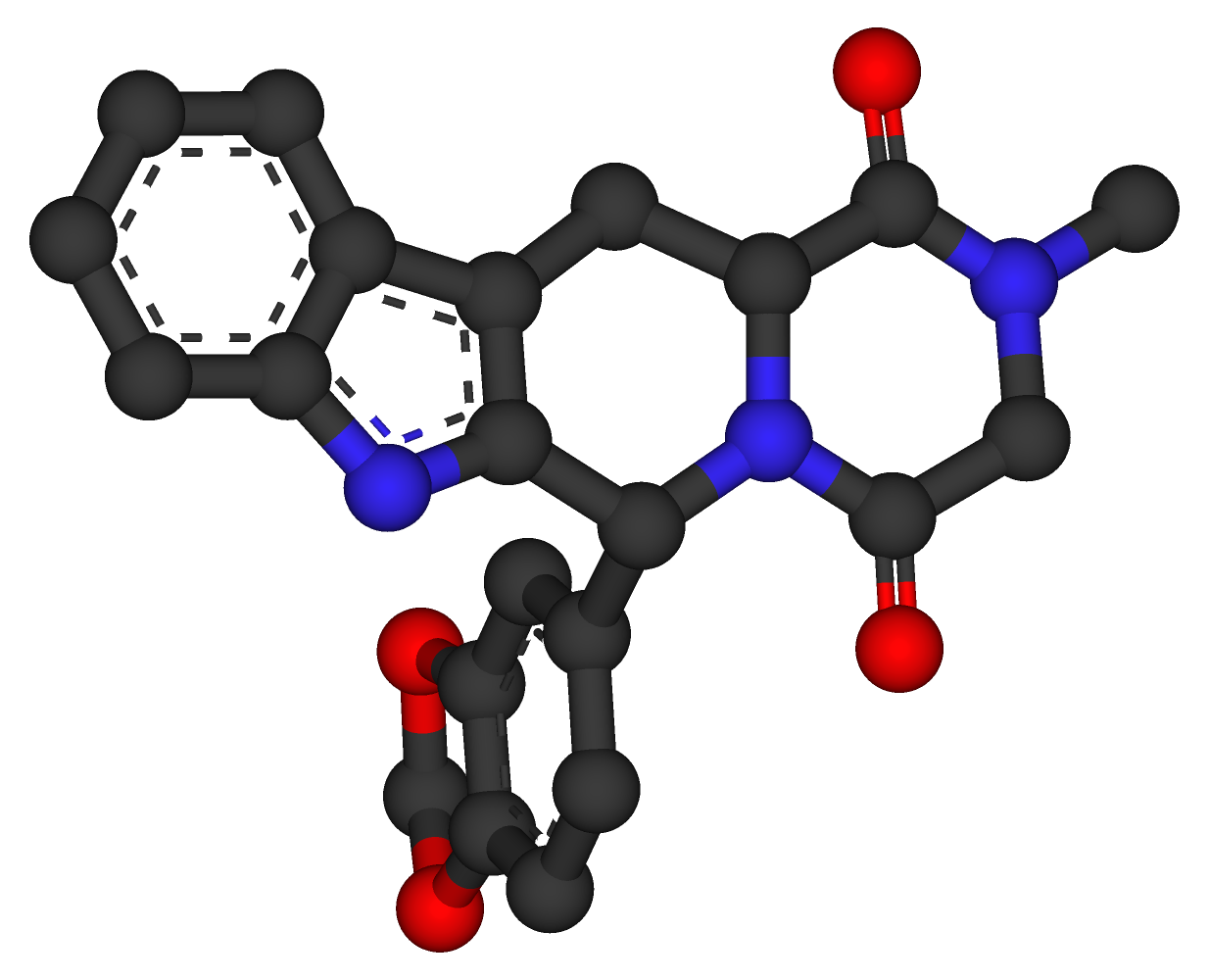

Clinical data
- Pronunciation: /təˈdæləfɪl/ tə-DAL-ə-fil
- Trade names: Cialis, others
- AHFS/Drugs.com: Monograph
- MedlinePlus: a604008
- License data: US DailyMed: Tadalafil
- Pregnancy category: AU: B1
- Routes of administration: By mouth
- Drug class: PDE5 inhibitor
- ATC code: G04BE08 (WHO)

Legal status
- Legal status: AU: S4 (Prescription only); UK: POM (Prescription only); US: ℞-only; EU: Rx-only; In general: ℞ (Prescription only)

Pharmacokinetic data
- Bioavailability: Varies
- Protein binding: 94%
- Metabolism: Liver (predominantly CYP3A4)
- Metabolites: Catechol metabolite
- Onset of action: 30 minutes
- Elimination half-life: 17.5 hours
- Duration of action: ≤ 36 hours
- Excretion: Feces (~61%), urine (~36%)

Identifiers
- IUPAC name: (6R,12aR)-6-(1,3-benzodioxol-5-yl)-2-methyl-2,3,6,7,12,12a-hexahydropyrazino[1',2':1,6] pyrido[3,4-b]indole-1,4-dione
- CAS Number: 171596-29-5
- PubChem CID: 110635
- IUPHAR/BPS: 7299
- DrugBank: DB00820
- ChemSpider: 99301
- UNII: 742SXX0ICT
- KEGG: D02008
- ChEBI: CHEBI:71940
- ChEMBL: ChEMBL779
- PDB ligand: CIA (PDBe, RCSB PDB)
- CompTox Dashboard (EPA): DTXSID9046786
- ECHA InfoCard: 100.214.024

Chemical and physical data
- Formula: C_{22}H_{19}N_{3}O_{4}
- Molar mass: 389.411 g·mol^{−1}
- 3D model (JSmol): Interactive image
- SMILES: CN1CC(=O)N2[C@H](Cc3c([nH]c4ccccc34)[C@H]2c2ccc3c(c2)OCO3)C1=O
- InChI: InChI=1S/C22H19N3O4/c1-24-10-19(26)25-16(22(24)27)9-14-13-4-2-3-5-15(13)23-20(14)21(25)12-6-7-17-18(8-12)29-11-28-17/h2-8,16,21,23H,9-11H2,1H3/t16-,21-/m1/s1; Key:WOXKDUGGOYFFRN-IIBYNOLFSA-N

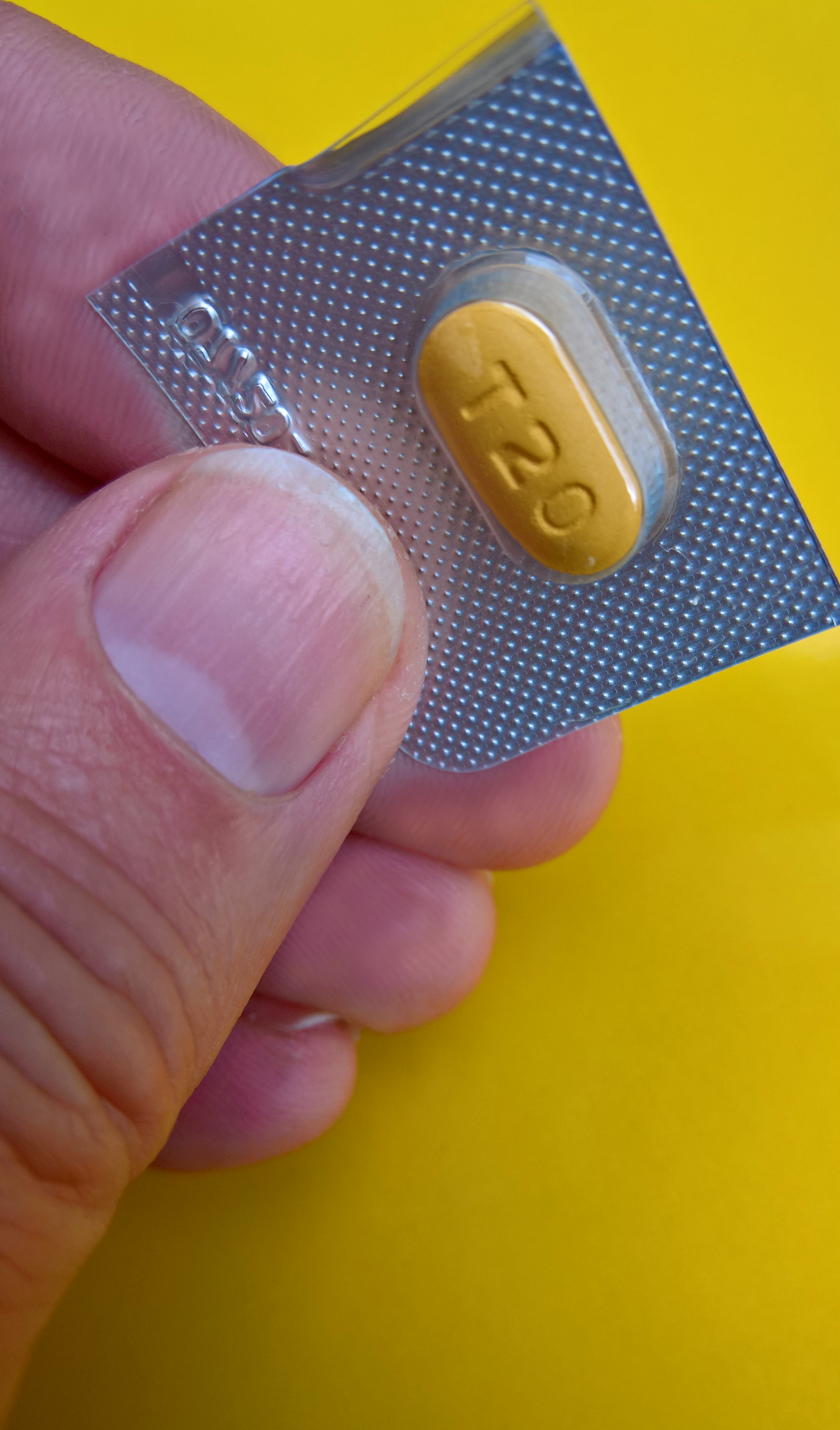
Tadalafil - STADA T20 - 20 milligram

Tadalafil, sold under the brand name Cialis among others, is a medication used to treat erectile dysfunction, benign prostatic hyperplasia, and pulmonary arterial hypertension. It is taken by mouth. Onset is typically within half an hour and the duration is up to 36 hours.

Common side effects include headache, muscle pain, flushing, and nausea. Caution is advised in those with cardiovascular disease. Rare but serious side effects include a prolonged erection that can lead to damage to the penis, vision problems, and hearing loss. Tadalafil is not recommended in people taking nitrovasodilators such as nitroglycerin, as this may result in a serious drop in blood pressure. Tadalafil is a PDE5 inhibitor which increases blood flow to the penis. It also dilates blood vessels in the lungs, which lowers the pulmonary artery pressure.

Tadalafil was approved for medical use in the United States in 2003. It is available as a generic medication. In 2022, it was the 172nd most commonly prescribed medication in the United States, with more than 3 million prescriptions.

== Medical uses ==
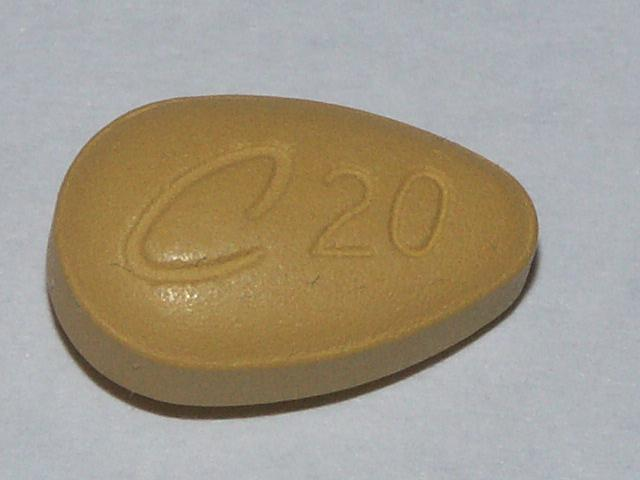
20 mg Cialis tablet

Tadalafil is used to treat erectile dysfunction, benign prostatic hyperplasia, and pulmonary arterial hypertension. In the United States, tadalafil (as Cialis) is indicated for the treatment of erectile dysfunction and the signs and symptoms of benign prostatic hyperplasia; and (as Adcirca) for the treatment of pulmonary arterial hypertension to improve exercise ability.

=== Benign prostatic hyperplasia ===
A meta-analysis found that tadalafil is an effective treatment for lower urinary tract symptoms due to benign prostatic hyperplasia and that such treatment had a low rate of adverse effects. Tadalafil is FDA-approved for males as a therapy to treat and prevent symptoms of benign prostatic hyperplasia, such as urinary urgency, hesitancy, weak stream, dribbling, and incontinence. Tadalafil was found to have similar benefits for lower urinary tract symptoms as the usually prescribed tamsulosin.

=== Pulmonary arterial hypertension ===
Tadalafil is approved in the United States, Canada, and Japan to improve exercise ability in people with pulmonary arterial hypertension.

== Adverse effects ==
The most common potential side effects when using tadalafil are headache, stomach discomfort or pain, indigestion, burping, acid reflux, back pain, myalgia (pain in limbs and extremities), flushing, hypertension (or uncommonly hypotension), and stuffy/runny nose. Also common are dizziness, peripheral edema, fatigue, and urinary or respiratory tract infection; both diarrhea and constipation have been reported. Diarrhea was reported more frequently in patients 65 or older than in younger subjects. These side effects reflect the ability of PDE5 inhibition to cause vasodilation (causing blood vessels to widen) and usually resolve after a few hours.

=== Vision ===
In May 2005, the US Food and Drug Administration (FDA) found that tadalafil (along with other PDE5 inhibitors) was associated with vision impairment related to NAION (non-arteritic anterior ischemic optic neuropathy). Most, but not all, of these patients, had underlying anatomic or vascular risk factors for the development of NAION, unrelated to PDE5 inhibitor use. The FDA concluded that they were not able to draw a cause and effect relationship, only an association; the label of all three PDE5 inhibitors was changed to alert clinicians to that fact. A 2019 meta-analysis found that tadalafil exposure was not associated with NAION.

=== Hearing ===
In October 2007, the FDA announced that the labeling for all PDE5 inhibitors, including tadalafil, requires a more prominent warning of the potential risk of sudden hearing loss as the result of post-marketing reports of deafness associated with use of PDE5 inhibitors.

== Metabolism ==
Tadalafil is metabolized predominantly by the liver CYP3A4 enzyme system.

== Mechanism of action ==
Penile erection during sexual stimulation is caused by increased penile blood flow resulting from the relaxation of penile arteries and the smooth muscle of the corpus cavernosum. This response is mediated by the release of nitric oxide (NO) from nerve terminals and endothelial cells, which stimulates the synthesis of cyclic guanosine monophosphate (more commonly known as cyclic GMP or cGMP) in smooth muscle cells. cGMP relaxes smooth muscle and increases blood flow to the corpus cavernosum.

The inhibition of phosphodiesterase type 5 (PDE5) enhances erectile function by increasing the amount of cGMP. Tadalafil (and sildenafil and vardenafil) inhibits PDE5. However, because sexual stimulation is required to initiate the local penile release of nitric oxide, tadalafil's inhibition of PDE5 will have no effect without sexual stimulation.

=== Duration of action ===
Although sildenafil, vardenafil, and tadalafil all work by inhibiting PDE5, tadalafil's pharmacologic distinction is its longer half-life (17.5 hours), compared to sildenafil and vardenafil, which are both 4–5 hours. This translates to a longer duration of action, which is partly responsible for "The Weekend Pill" nickname. Furthermore, the longer half-life is the basis for tadalafil's daily therapeutic use in treating pulmonary arterial hypertension.

=== Comparison with actions of other PDE5 inhibitors ===
Sildenafil and vardenafil inhibit PDE6, an enzyme found in the eye, more than tadalafil. Some sildenafil users see a bluish tinge and have a heightened sensitivity to light because of PDE6 inhibition.

Sildenafil and vardenafil also inhibit PDE1 more than tadalafil. PDE1 is found in the brain, heart, and vascular smooth muscle. It is thought that the inhibition of PDE1 by sildenafil and vardenafil leads to vasodilation, flushing, and tachycardia.

Tadalafil inhibits PDE11 more than sildenafil or vardenafil. PDE11 is expressed in skeletal muscle, the prostate, the liver, the kidney, the pituitary gland, and the testes. The effects on the body of inhibiting PDE11 are not known.

== Chemistry ==
Tadalafil is an annulated 2,5-diketopiperazine. It is also a 1,2,3,4-tetrahydro-β-carboline.

Tadalafil can be synthesized starting from (D)-tryptophan methyl ester and piperonal via a Pictet–Spengler reaction. This is followed by condensations with chloroacetyl chloride and methylamine to complete the diketopiperazine ring:

== History ==
The FDA's approval of sildenafil in 1998 was a ground-breaking commercial event for the treatment of ED, with sales exceeding US$1 billion. Subsequently, the FDA approved both vardenafil and tadalafil in 2003.

It initially was developed by the biotechnology company ICOS, and then again developed and marketed worldwide by Lilly ICOS, LLC, the joint venture of ICOS Corporation and Eli Lilly and Company. Tadalafil was approved in 2009 in the United States for the treatment of pulmonary arterial hypertension and is under regulatory review in other regions for this condition. In late November 2008, Eli Lilly sold the exclusive rights to commercialize tadalafil for pulmonary arterial hypertension in the United States to United Therapeutics for an upfront payment of $150 million.

Tadalafil was discovered by Glaxo Wellcome (now GlaxoSmithKline) under a partnership between Glaxo and ICOS to develop new drugs that began in August 1991. In 1993, the Bothell, Washington, biotechnology company ICOS Corporation began studying compound IC351, a phosphodiesterase type 5 (PDE5) enzyme inhibitor. In 1994, Pfizer scientists discovered that sildenafil, which also inhibits the PDE5 enzyme, caused penile erection in males participating in a clinical study of a heart medicine. Although ICOS scientists were not testing compound IC351 for treating ED, they recognized its potential usefulness for treating that disorder. Soon, in 1994, ICOS received a patent for compound IC351 (structurally unlike sildenafil and vardenafil), and Phase 1 clinical trials began in 1995. In 1997, the Phase 2 clinical studies were initiated for males experiencing ED, then progressed to the Phase 3 trials that supported the drug's FDA approval. Although Glaxo had an agreement with ICOS to share profits 50/50 for drugs resulting from the partnership, Glaxo let the agreement lapse in 1996 as the drugs developed were not in the company's core markets. In 1998, ICOS Corporation and Eli Lilly and Company formed the Lilly ICOS, LLC, a joint venture company to further develop and commercialize tadalafil as a treatment for ED. Two years later, Lilly ICOS, LLC, filed a new drug application with the FDA for compound IC351 (under the tadalafil generic name, and the Cialis brand name). In May 2002, Lilly ICOS reported to the American Urological Association that clinical trial testing demonstrated that tadalafil was effective for up to 36 hours, and one year later, the FDA approved tadalafil. One advantage Cialis has over Viagra and Levitra is its 17.5-hour half-life (thus Cialis is advertised to work for up to 36 hours, after which time there remains approximately 25% of the absorbed dose in the body) when compared to the four-hour half-life of sildenafil (Viagra).

In 2007, Eli Lilly and Company bought the ICOS Corporation for $2.3 billion. As a result, Eli Lilly owned Cialis and then closed the ICOS operations, ending the joint venture and firing most of ICOS's approximately 500 employees, except for 127 employees of the ICOS biologics facility, which subsequently was bought by CMC Biopharmaceuticals A/S (CMC).

Persons surnamed "Cialis" objected to Eli Lilly and Company's so naming the drug, but the company has maintained that the drug's trade name is unrelated to the surname.

In October 2011, the US FDA approved tadalafil to treat the signs and symptoms of benign prostatic hyperplasia. Benign prostatic hyperplasia is a condition in which the prostate gland becomes enlarged, obstructing the free flow of urine. Symptoms may include sudden urges to urinate (urgency), difficulty in starting urination (hesitancy), a weak urine stream, and more frequent urination—especially at night. The FDA has also approved tadalafil for the treatment of both benign prostatic hyperplasia and erectile dysfunction where the two conditions co-exist.

== Society and culture ==
=== Marketing ===
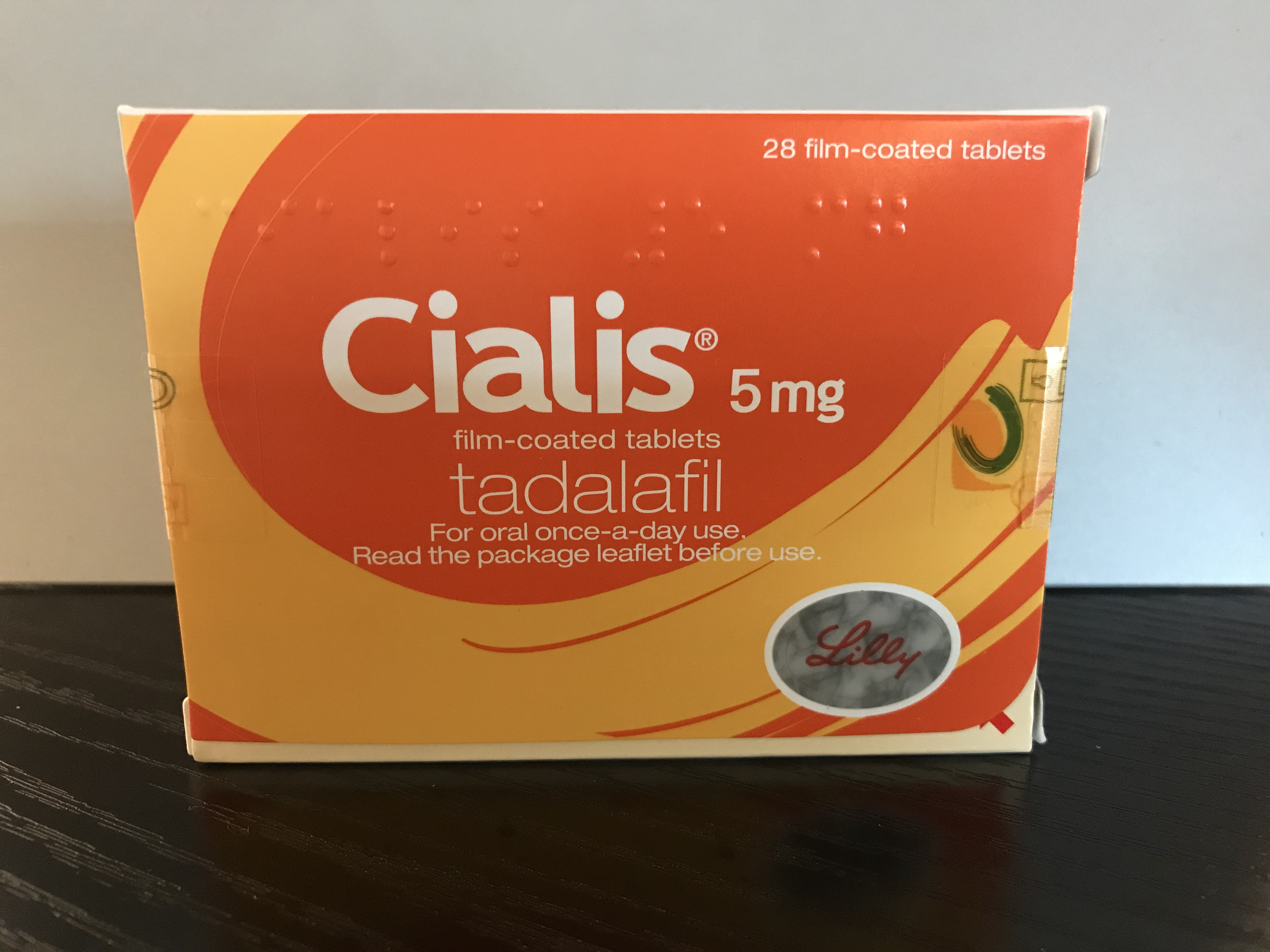
Cialis 5 mg UK pack of 28 tablets

In the United States, the FDA relaxed rules on prescription drug marketing in 1997, allowing advertisements targeted directly to consumers. Lilly-ICOS hired the Grey Worldwide Agency in New York, part of the Grey Global Group, to run the Cialis advertising campaign. Marketing for Cialis has taken advantage of its greater duration compared to its competitors in advertisements for the drug; Stuart Elliot of The New York Times opined: "The continuous presence of females in Cialis ads is a subtle signal that the drug makes it easier for them to set the pace with males, in contrast to the primarily male-driven imagery for Levitra and Viagra." Iconic themes in Cialis ads include couples side by side in matching bathtubs and the slogan "When the moment is right, will you be ready?" Cialis ads were unique among the ED drugs in mentioning specifics of the drug. As a result, Cialis ads were also the first to describe the side effects in an advertisement, as the FDA requires advertisements with specifics to mention side effects. One of the first Cialis ads aired at the 2004 Super Bowl. Just weeks before the Super Bowl, the FDA required more possible side effects to be listed in the advertisement, including priapism. Although many parents objected to the Cialis ad being aired during the Super Bowl, Janet Jackson's halftime "wardrobe malfunction" overshadowed Cialis. In January 2006, the Cialis ads were tweaked, adding a doctor on screen to describe side effects and only running ads where more than 90 percent of the audience are adults, effectively ending Super Bowl ads. In 2004, Lilly-ICOS, Pfizer, and GlaxoSmithKline spent a combined $373.1 million to advertise Cialis, Viagra, and Levitra respectively. Cialis has sponsored many sporting events, including the America's Cup and the PGA Tour, once being title sponsor of the PGA Tour Western Open tournament.

=== Economics ===
In Australia, tadalafil is subsidized through the Repatriation Pharmaceutical Benefits Scheme (RPBS) for patients with a specific accepted war- or service-related disability.

In the US, a generic version of tadalafil is available. While some health insurance providers cover at least part of the cost (typically limiting the number of doses covered per month), many providers, including those operating under Medicare Part D, do not cover the cost of medications prescribed for erectile dysfunction.

In the UK, a generic version of tadalafil became available in November 2017, reducing its price per pill, and is available through the NHS. In China, CMOAPI is the largest manufacturer of Tadalafil powder.

== Research ==
Tadalafil is being studied for treating Peyronie's disease.
