= Sildenafil =

Drug for erectile dysfunction and hypertension

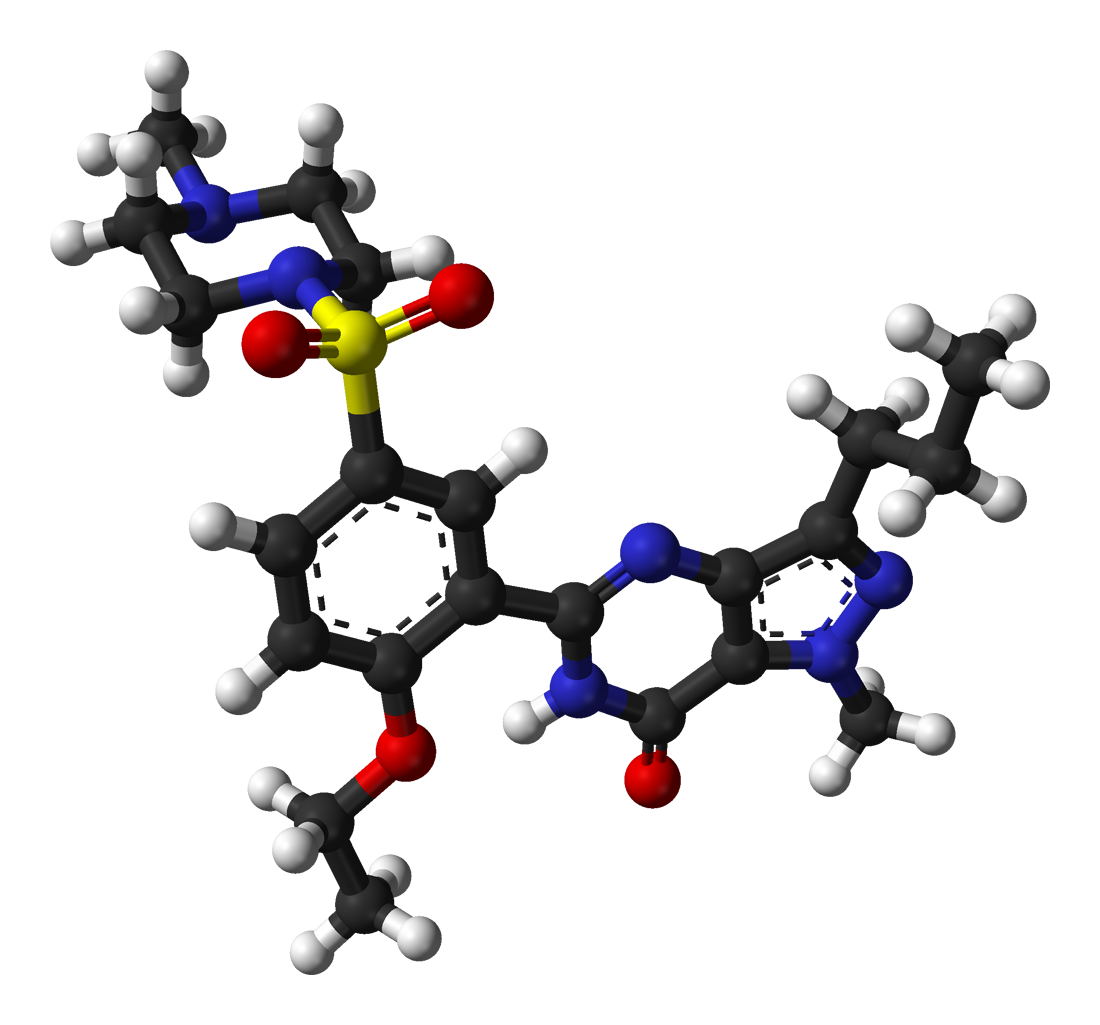

Clinical data
- Pronunciation: /sɪlˈdɛnəfɪl/ sil-DEN-ə-fil
- Trade names: Viagra, others
- AHFS/Drugs.com: Monograph
- MedlinePlus: a699015
- License data: US DailyMed: Sildenafil
- Pregnancy category: AU: B1
- Routes of administration: By mouth, sublingual, intravenous
- Drug class: PDE5 inhibitor
- ATC code: G04BE03 (WHO)

Legal status
- Legal status: AU: S4 (Prescription only); CA: ℞-only; UK: POM (Prescription only) / Pharmacy; US: ℞-only; EU: Rx-only; In general: ℞ (Prescription only)

Pharmacokinetic data
- Bioavailability: 41% (mean)
- Protein binding: ~96%
- Metabolism: Liver: CYP3A4 (major route), CYP2C9 (minor route)
- Metabolites: N-desmethylsildenafil (~50% potency for PDE_{5})
- Onset of action: 20 minutes
- Elimination half-life: 3–4 hours
- Excretion: Feces (~80%), urine (~13%)

Identifiers
- IUPAC name: 5-{2-Ethoxy-5-[(4-methylpiperazin-1-yl)sulfonyl]phenyl}-1-methyl-3-propyl-1,6-dihydro-6H-pyrazolo[4,3-d]pyrimidin-7-one
- CAS Number: 139755-83-2; citrate: 171599-83-0
- PubChem CID: 135398744; citrate: 135413523
- DrugBank: DB00203; citrate: DBSALT000347
- ChemSpider: 5023; citrate: 56586
- UNII: 3M7OB98Y7H; citrate: BW9B0ZE037
- KEGG: D08514; citrate: D02229
- ChEBI: CHEBI:9139; citrate: CHEBI:58987
- ChEMBL: ChEMBL192; citrate: ChEMBL1737
- PDB ligand: VIA (PDBe, RCSB PDB)
- CompTox Dashboard (EPA): DTXSID6023579
- ECHA InfoCard: 100.122.676

Chemical and physical data
- Formula: C_{22}H_{30}N_{6}O_{4}S
- Molar mass: 474.58 g·mol^{−1}
- 3D model (JSmol): Interactive image
- SMILES: CCCC1=NN(C2=C1N=C(NC2=O)C3=C(C=CC(=C3)S(=O)(=O)N4CCN(CC4)C)OCC)C
- InChI: InChI=1S/C22H30N6O4S/c1-5-7-17-19-20(27(4)25-17)22(29)24-21(23-19)16-14-15(8-9-18(16)32-6-2)33(30,31)28-12-10-26(3)11-13-28/h8-9,14H,5-7,10-13H2,1-4H3,(H,23,24,29); Key:BNRNXUUZRGQAQC-UHFFFAOYSA-N

Sildenafil, sold under the brand name Viagra among others, is a medication used to treat erectile dysfunction and pulmonary arterial hypertension. It is also sometimes used off-label for the treatment of certain symptoms in secondary Raynaud's phenomenon. It is unclear if it is effective for treating sexual dysfunction in females. It can be taken orally (swallowed by mouth), intravenously (injection into a vein), or through the sublingual route (dissolved under the tongue). Onset when taken orally is typically within twenty minutes and lasts for about two hours.

Common side effects include headaches, heartburn, and flushed skin. Caution is advised in those with cardiovascular disease. Rare but serious side effects include vision problems, hearing loss, and prolonged erection (priapism) that can lead to damage to the penis. Sildenafil should not be taken by people on nitric oxide donors such as nitroglycerin, as this may result in a serious drop in blood pressure.

Sildenafil acts by blocking phosphodiesterase 5 (PDE5), an enzyme that promotes breakdown of cGMP, which regulates blood flow in the penis. It requires sexual arousal to work, and does not by itself cause or increase sexual arousal. It also results in dilation of the blood vessels in the lungs.

Pfizer originally discovered the medication in 1989 while looking for a treatment for angina. It was approved for medical use in the United States and in the European Union in 1998. In 2023, it was the 151st most commonly prescribed medication in the United States, with more than 3 million prescriptions. It is available as a generic medication. In the United Kingdom, it is available as a pharmacy medicine.

== Medical uses ==
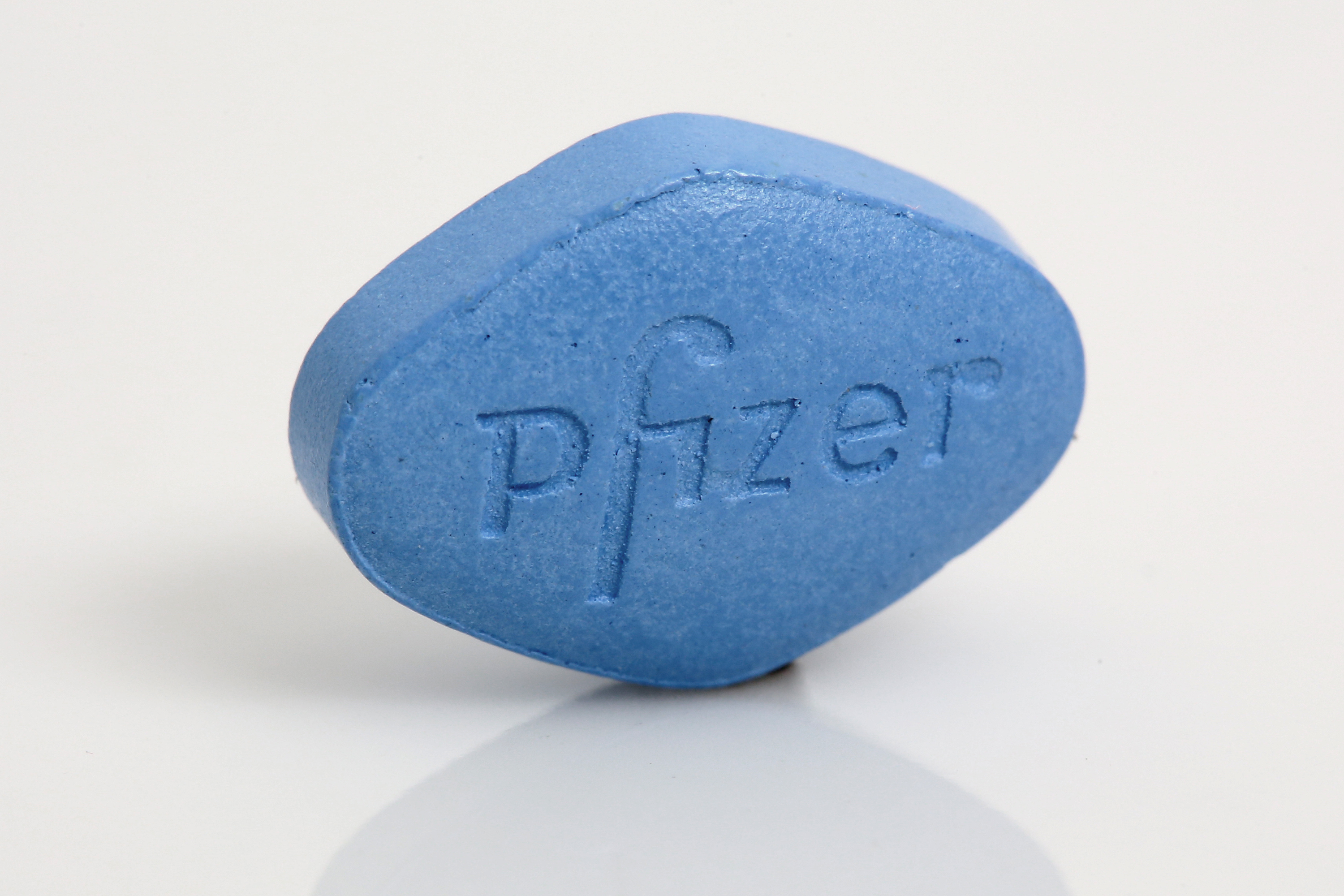
Pfizer Viagra tablet in the trademark blue diamond shape

=== Erectile dysfunction ===
The primary indication of sildenafil is treatment of erectile dysfunction (inability to sustain a satisfactory erection to complete sexual intercourse). Its use is now one of the standard treatments for erectile dysfunction, including for males with diabetes mellitus.

Tentative evidence suggests that sildenafil may help males who experience antidepressant-induced erectile dysfunction.

=== Pulmonary hypertension ===
While sildenafil improves some markers of disease in people with pulmonary arterial hypertension, it does not appear to affect the risk of death or serious side effects.

=== Raynaud's phenomenon ===
Sildenafil and other PDE5 inhibitors are used off-label to alleviate vasospasm and treat severe ischemia and ulcers in fingers and toes for people with secondary Raynaud's phenomenon; these drugs have moderate efficacy for reducing the frequency and duration of vasospastic episodes. As of 2016, their role more generally in Raynaud's was not clear.

=== Altitude sickness ===
Sildenafil has shown some potential for improving exercise performance at high altitudes. However, its overall efficacy is not clear.

==== High-altitude pulmonary edema ====
Sildenafil has been studied for high-altitude pulmonary edema (HAPE), but its use is currently not recommended for that indication.

== Adverse effects ==
In clinical trials, the most common adverse effects of sildenafil use included headache, flushing, indigestion, nasal congestion, and impaired vision, including photophobia and blurred vision. Some sildenafil users have complained of seeing everything tinted blue (cyanopsia). This cyanopsia can be explained because sildenafil, while selective for PDE_{5}, does have some affinity for PDE_{6}, which is the phosphodiesterase found in the retina. Patients thus taking the drug may experience colorvision abnormalities. Some complained of blurriness and loss of peripheral vision. In July 2005, the US Food and Drug Administration (FDA) updated labeling for tadalafil (Cialis), vardenafil (Levitra), and sildenafil (Viagra) to reflect a small number of post-marketing reports of sudden vision loss, while acknowledging that "...it is not possible to determine whether these oral medicines for erectile dysfunction were the cause of the loss of eyesight or whether the problem is related to other factors such as high blood pressure or diabetes, or to a combination of these problems." A careful review of pooled data from clinical trials containing well documented information about the dose and duration of exposure to the drug for a large number of patients, yields no evidence for an increased risk of non-arteritic anterior ischemic optic neuropathy or other adverse ocular events associated with PDE5 inhibitor use.

Rare but serious adverse effects found through postmarketing surveillance include prolonged erections, severe low blood pressure, myocardial infarction (heart attack), ventricular arrhythmias, stroke, increased intraocular pressure, and sudden hearing loss. In October 2007, the FDA announced that the labeling for all PDE_{5} inhibitors, including sildenafil, required a more prominent warning of the potential risk of sudden hearing loss.

=== Interactions ===
Care should be exercised by people who are also taking protease inhibitors for the treatment of HIV infection. Protease inhibitors inhibit the metabolism of sildenafil, effectively multiplying the plasma levels of sildenafil, increasing the incidence and severity of side effects. Those using protease inhibitors are recommended to limit their use of sildenafil to no more than one 25 mg dose every 48 hours. Other drugs that interfere with the metabolism of sildenafil include erythromycin and cimetidine, both of which can also lead to prolonged plasma half-life levels.

The use of sildenafil and an α_{1} blocker (typically prescribed for hypertension or for urologic conditions, such as benign prostatic hypertrophy) at the same time may lead to low blood pressure, but this effect does not occur if they are taken at least 4 hours apart.

=== Contraindications ===
Contraindications include:

- Concomitant use of nitric oxide donors, organic nitrites and nitrates, such as:
  - nitroglycerin
  - isosorbide mononitrate
  - isosorbide dinitrate
  - sodium nitroprusside
  - alkyl nitrites (commonly known as "poppers")
- Concomitant use of soluble guanylyl cyclase stimulators, such as riociguat
- Known hypersensitivity to sildenafil

Sildenafil should not be used if sexual activity is inadvisable due to underlying cardiovascular risk factors.

== Non-medical use ==
=== Recreational use ===
Sildenafil's popularity with young adults has increased over the years. Sildenafil's brand name, Viagra, is widely recognized in popular culture, and the drug's association with treating erectile dysfunction has led to its recreational use. The reasons behind such use include the belief that the drug increases libido, improves sexual performance, or permanently increases penis size. Studies on the effects of sildenafil when used recreationally are limited, but suggest it has little effect when used by those who do not have erectile dysfunction. In one study, a 25 mg dose was shown to cause no significant change in erectile quality, but did reduce the postejaculatory refractory time. This study also noted a significant placebo effect in the control group.

Unprescribed recreational use of sildenafil and other PDE5 inhibitors is noted as particularly high among users of illegal drugs. Sildenafil is sometimes used to counteract the effects of other substances, often illicit. Some users mix it with MDMA, other stimulants, or opioids in an attempt to compensate for the common side effect of erectile dysfunction, a combination known as "sextasy", "rockin' and rollin'", "hammerheading", or "trail mix". Mixing it with amyl nitrite, another vasodilator, is particularly dangerous and potentially fatal.

=== Sports ===
Professional athletes have been documented using sildenafil, believing the opening of their blood vessels will enrich their muscles. In turn, they believe it will enhance their performances.

=== Analogs ===
Acetildenafil and other synthetic structural analogs of sildenafil which are PDE5 inhibitors have been found as adulterants in a number of "herbal" aphrodisiac products sold over-the-counter. These analogs have not undergone any of the rigorous testing that drugs like sildenafil have passed, and thus have unknown side-effect profiles. Some attempts have been made to ban these drugs, but progress has been slow so far, as, even in those jurisdictions that have laws targeting designer drugs, the laws are drafted to ban analogs of illegal drugs of abuse, rather than analogs of prescription medicines. However, at least one court case has resulted in a product being taken off the market.

The US Food and Drug Administration (FDA) has banned numerous products claiming to be Eurycoma longifolia that, in fact, contain only analogs of sildenafil. Sellers of such fake herbals typically respond by just changing the names of their products.

== Detection in biological fluids ==
Sildenafil and/or N-desmethylsildenafil, its major active metabolite, may be quantified in plasma, serum, or whole blood to assess pharmacokinetic status in those receiving the drug therapeutically, to confirm the diagnosis in potential poisoning victims, or to assist in the forensic investigation in a case of fatal overdose.

== Mechanism of action ==
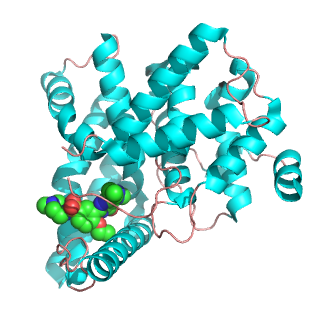
Crystal structure of human PDE5 with bound sildenafil, PDB entry 1udt

Sildenafil protects cyclic guanosine monophosphate (cGMP) from degradation by cGMP-specific phosphodiesterase type 5 (PDE5) in the corpus cavernosum. Nitric oxide (NO) in the corpus cavernosum of the penis binds to guanylate cyclase receptors, which results in increased levels of cGMP, leading to smooth muscle relaxation (vasodilation) of the intimal cushions of the helicine arteries. This smooth muscle relaxation leads to vasodilation and increased inflow of blood into the spongy tissue of the penis, causing an erection. Robert F. Furchgott, Ferid Murad, and Louis Ignarro won the Nobel Prize in Physiology or Medicine in 1998 for their independent study of the metabolic pathway of nitric oxide in smooth muscle vasodilation.

The molecular mechanism of smooth muscle relaxation involves the enzyme CGMP-dependent protein kinase, also known as PKG. This kinase is activated by cGMP and it phosphorylates multiple targets in the smooth muscle cells, namely myosin light chain phosphatase, RhoA, IP3 receptor, phospholipase C, and others. Overall, this results in a decrease in intracellular calcium and desensitizing proteins to the effects of calcium, engendering smooth muscle relaxation.

Sildenafil is a potent and selective inhibitor of cGMP-specific phosphodiesterase type 5 (PDE5), which is responsible for degradation of cGMP in the corpus cavernosum. The molecular structure of sildenafil is similar to that of cGMP and acts as a competitive binding agent of PDE5 in the corpus cavernosum, resulting in more cGMP and increased penile response to sexual stimulation. Without sexual stimulation, and therefore lack of activation of the NO/cGMP system, sildenafil should not cause an erection. Other drugs that operate by the same mechanism include tadalafil (Cialis) and vardenafil (Levitra).

Sildenafil is broken down in the liver by hepatic metabolism using cytochrome p450 enzymes, mainly CYP450 3A4 (major route), but also by CYP2C9 (minor route) hepatic isoenzymes. The major product of metabolisation by these enzymes is N-desmethylated sildenafil, which is metabolised further. This metabolite also has an affinity for the PDE receptors, about 40% of that of sildenafil. Thus, the metabolite is responsible for about 20% of sildenafil's action. Sildenafil is excreted as metabolites predominantly in the feces (about 80% of administered oral dose) and to a lesser extent in the urine (around 13% of the administered oral dose). If taken with a high-fat meal, absorption is reduced; the time taken to reach the maximum plasma concentration increases by around one hour, and the maximum concentration itself is decreased by nearly one-third.

== Route of administration ==
- When taken orally, sildenafil for erectile dysfunction results in an average time to onset of erections of 27 minutes (ranging from 12 to 70 minutes).
- Sublingual use of sildenafil for erectile dysfunction results in an average onset of action of 15 minutes and lasting for an average of 40 minutes.

== Chemical synthesis ==
The preparation steps for synthesis of sildenafil are:

1. Methylation of 3-propylpyrazole-5-carboxylic acid ethyl ester with hot dimethyl sulfate
2. Hydrolysis with aqueous sodium hydroxide (NaOH) to free acid
3. Nitration with oleum/fuming nitric acid
4. Carboxamide formation with refluxing thionyl chloride/NH_{4}OH
5. Reduction of nitro group to amino group
6. Acylation with 2-ethoxybenzoyl chloride
7. Cyclization
8. Sulfonation to the chlorosulfonyl derivative
9. Condensation with 1-methylpiperazine.

== History ==
Sildenafil (compound UK-92,480) was synthesized in 1989 by a group of pharmaceutical chemists led by Simon Campbell working at Pfizer's Sandwich, Kent, research facility in England. It was initially studied for use in hypertension (high blood pressure) and angina pectoris (a symptom of ischaemic heart disease). The first clinical trials were conducted in Morriston Hospital in Swansea. Phase I clinical trials under the direction of Ian Osterloh suggested the drug had little effect on angina, but it could induce marked penile erections. Pfizer therefore decided to market it for erectile dysfunction, rather than for angina; this decision became an often-cited example of drug repositioning. The drug was patented in 1996, approved for use in erectile dysfunction by the FDA on 27 March 1998, becoming the first oral treatment approved to treat erectile dysfunction in the United States, and offered for sale in the United States later that year. It soon became a great success: annual sales of Viagra peaked in 2008 at US$1.934 billion.

== Society and culture ==
=== Marketing and sales ===
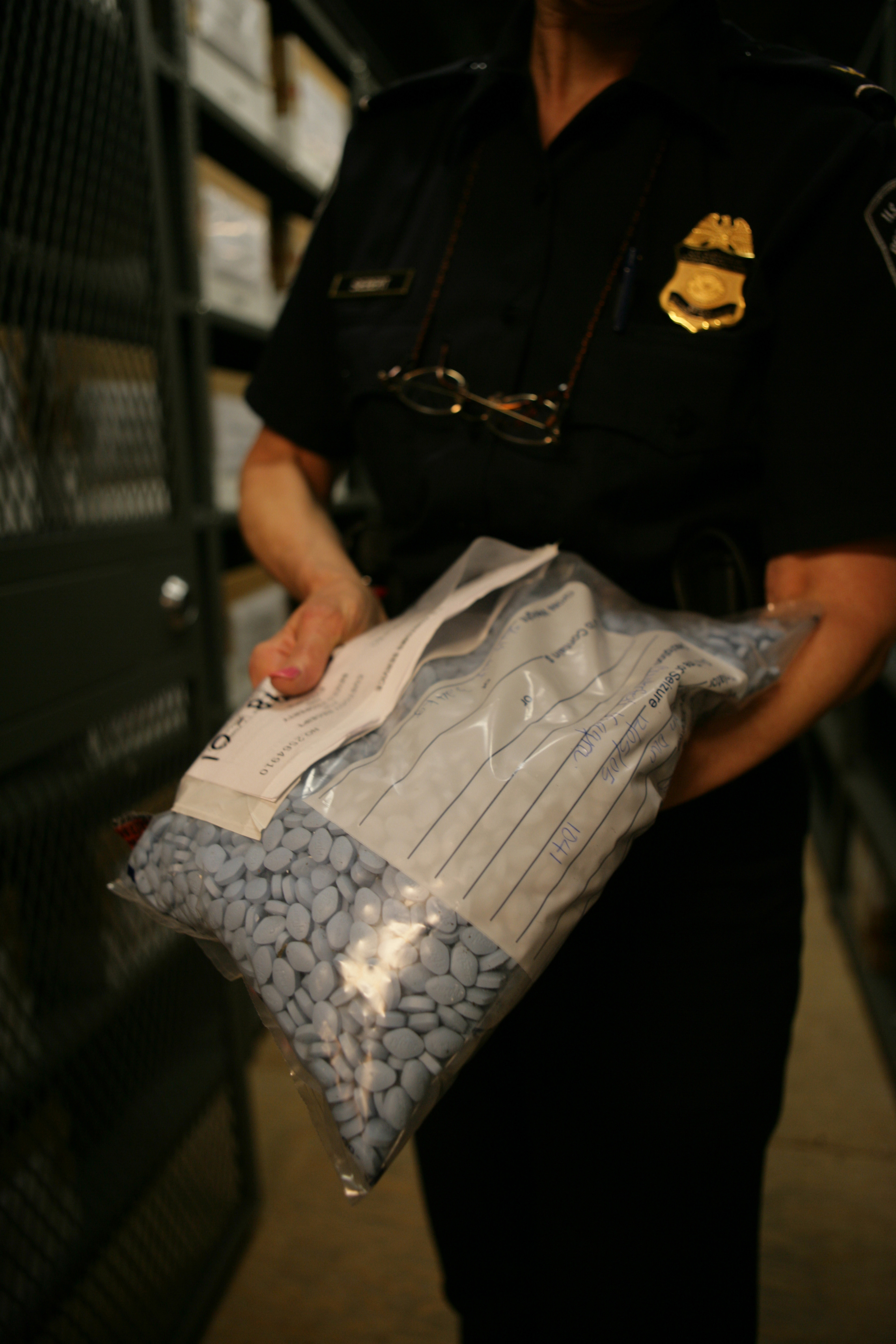
Bulk bag of counterfeit Viagra

In the US, even though sildenafil is available only by prescription from a doctor, it was advertised directly to consumers on TV (famously being endorsed by former United States Senator Bob Dole and football star Pelé). Numerous sites on the Internet offer Viagra for sale after an "online consultation", often a simple web questionnaire.

Viagra and other products for sexual dysfunction, termed sexuopharmaceuticals, proliferated new types of specialised marketing for such products. Viagra and similar prescription pharmaceuticals were promoted by images in media to the extent of becoming a cultural icon, at the time a relatively new phenomenon known to be permitted only in the United States and New Zealand and which is believed to have significantly contributed to norms regarding male sexuality. One author notes that although the effect of Viagra is only limited to penile blood vessels, advertisements routinely use imagery of couples hugging, smiling and dancing, with the author claiming that pharmaceutical companies were deceptive in the use of such advertisements.

In 2000, Viagra sales accounted for 92% of the global market for prescribed erectile dysfunction pills. By 2007, Viagra's global share had plunged to about 50% due to several factors, including the entry of Cialis and Levitra, along with several counterfeits and clones, and reports of vision loss in people taking PDE5 inhibitors. In 2008, the FDA forced Pfizer to remove Viva Cruiser, an advergame for Viagra, from appearing on Forbes, after the game failed to disclose risk information about the drug.

In February 2007, it was announced that Boots, the UK pharmacy chain, would try over-the-counter sales of Viagra in stores in Manchester, England. Males between the ages of 30 and 65 would be eligible to buy four tablets after a consultation with a pharmacist. In 2017, the Medicines and Healthcare products Regulatory Agency (MHRA) enacted legislation that expanded this nationwide, allowing a particular branded formulation of Sildenafil, Viagra Connect (50 mg), to be sold over the counter and without a prescription throughout the UK from early 2018. While the sale remains subject to a consultation with a pharmacist, the other restrictions from the trial have been removed, allowing customers over the age of 18 to purchase an unlimited number of pills.

In May 2013, Pfizer, which manufactures Viagra, told the Associated Press they will begin selling the drug directly to people on its website.

Pfizer's patents on Viagra expired outside the US in 2012; in the US they were set to expire, but Pfizer settled litigation with each of Mylan and Teva which agreed that both companies could introduce generics in the US in December 2017. In December 2017, Pfizer released its own generic version of Viagra.

As of 2018, the US Food and Drug Administration has approved fifteen drug manufacturers to market generic sildenafil in the United States. Seven of these companies are based in India.

The patent for Pfizer's Viagra sildenafil to treat erectile dysfunction expired in April 2020.

In 2026 a chocolate syrup called Boner Bears from Lockout Supplements was recalled through the FDA because of it containing Sildenafil as an undisclosed ingredient.

=== Counterfeits ===
Counterfeit Viagra, despite generally being cheaper, can contain harmful substances or substances that affect how Viagra works, such as blue printer ink, amphetamines, metronidazole, boric acid, and rat poison.

Viagra is one of the world's most counterfeited medicines. According to a 2012 Pfizer study, around 80% of sites claiming to sell Viagra were selling counterfeits.

An October 2023 release stated that erectile dysfunction medicines were the most seized drugs by the Interpol accounting for 22% of seizures. International networks may be active.

=== Regional issues ===
==== United States ====
In 1992, Pfizer filed a patent covering the substance sildenafil and its use to treat cardiovascular diseases. This would be marketed as Revatio. The patent was published in 1993 and expired in 2012. The patent on Revatio (indicated for pulmonary arterial hypertension rather than erectile dysfunction) expired in late 2012. Generic versions of this low-dose form of sildenafil have been available in the US from a number of manufacturers, including Greenstone, Mylan, and Watson, since early 2013. Health care providers may prescribe generic sildenafil for erectile dysfunction. For a time, the generic was not available in the same dosages as branded Viagra, so using dosages typically required for treating ED required patients to take multiple pills.

In 1994, Pfizer filed a patent covering the use of sildenafil to treat erectile dysfunction. This would be marketed as Viagra. This patent was published in 2002 and expired in 2019. Teva sued to have the latter patent invalidated, but Pfizer prevailed in an August 2011 federal district court case. An agreement with Pfizer allowed Teva to begin to provide the generic drug in December 2017.

In the United States, Pfizer received two patents for sildenafil: one for its indication to treat cardiovascular disease (marketed as Revatio) and another for its indication to treat erectile dysfunction (marketed as Viagra). The substance is the same under both brand names.

Sildenafil is available as a generic drug in the United States, labeled for pulmonary arterial hypertension, and to treat erectile dysfunction, as the patent expired in April 2020.

In the US, Revatio and Viagra are marketed by Viatris after Upjohn was spun off from Pfizer.

==== Brazil ====
Pfizer's patent on sildenafil citrate expired in Brazil in 2010.

==== Canada ====
In Canada, Pfizer's patent 2,324,324 for Revatio (sildenafil used to treat pulmonary hypertension) was found invalid by the Federal Court in June 2010, on an application by Ratiopharm Inc.

On 8 November 2012, the Supreme Court of Canada ruled that Pfizer's patent 2,163,446 on Viagra was invalid from the beginning because the company did not provide full disclosure in its application. The decision, Teva Canada Ltd. v. Pfizer Canada Inc., pointed to section 27(3)(b) of The Patent Act which requires that disclosure must include sufficient information "to enable any person skilled in the art or science to which it pertains" to produce it. It added further: "As a matter of policy and sound statutory interpretation, patentees cannot be allowed to 'game' the system in this way. This, in my view, is the key issue in this appeal."

Teva Canada launched Novo-Sildenafil, a generic version of Viagra, on the day the Supreme Court of Canada released its decision. To remain competitive, Pfizer then reduced the price of Viagra in Canada. However, on 9 November 2012, Pfizer filed a motion for a re-hearing of the appeal in the Supreme Court of Canada, on the grounds that the court accidentally exceeded its jurisdiction by voiding the patent. Finally, on 22 April 2013, the Supreme Court of Canada invalidated Pfizer's patent altogether.

==== China ====
Manufacture and sale of sildenafil citrate drugs is common in China, where Pfizer's patent claim is not widely enforced.

==== Egypt ====
Egypt approved Viagra for sale in 2002, but soon afterwards allowed local companies to produce generic versions of the drug, citing the interests of poor people who would not be able to afford Pfizer's price.

==== European Union ====
Sildenafil 100 milligram tablets (prescription in the European Union)

In June 2013 Pfizer's patent on sildenafil citrate expired in some member countries of the European Union, including Austria, Denmark, France, Germany, Ireland, Italy, The Netherlands, Spain, Sweden, the United Kingdom, and Switzerland. A UK patent held by Pfizer on the use of PDE5 inhibitors (see below) as treatment of impotence was invalidated in 2000 because of obviousness; this decision was upheld on appeal in 2002.

==== India ====
Manufacture and sale of sildenafil citrate drugs known as "generic Viagra" is common in India, where Pfizer's patent claim does not apply. Brand names include Kamagra (Ajanta Pharma), Silagra (Cipla), Edegra (Sun Pharmaceutical), Penegra (Zydus Cadila), Manly (Cooper Pharma) and Zenegra (Alkem Laboratories).

==== New Zealand ====
Sildenafil was reclassified in New Zealand in 2014 so it could be bought over the counter from a pharmacist. It is thought that this reduced sales over the Internet and was safer as males could be referred for medical advice if appropriate.

==== South Korea ====
In 1999 South Korea granted two patents to Pfizer related to sildenafil. The first document guaranteed sole production and sale of the substance until 2012, while the second gave Pfizer the exclusive use to treating erectile dysfunction with sildenafil until 2014. In 2011 Hanmi Pharmaceutical and CJ CheilJedang launched a suit against the exclusive use patent. The Korean Court system made a ruling against Pfizer in June 2012, allowing for the unhindered domestic production of generic prescription sildenafil.

In 2012, Viagra lost its position as the top selling erectile dysfunction treatment in South Korea. This development was credited largely "due to the introduction of generic products." Generic sildenafil became publicly available in May. Sales of PalPal by Hanmi Pharmaceuticals totalled ₩22 billion or about 86% the market share of Viagra that year. By 2017, there were over 50 generic sildenafil pills available. During that year Viagra sales slumped to 38% that of Palpal.

==== United Kingdom ====
There were 2,958,199 prescriptions for Sildenafil in 2016 in England, compared with 1,042,431 in 2006.

In 2018, Viagra Connect, a particular formulation of Sildenafil marketed by Pfizer, became available for sale without a prescription in the UK.
