= Vardenafil =

Chemical compound

Clinical data
- Trade names: Levitra, Staxyn, Vivanza
- AHFS/Drugs.com: Monograph
- MedlinePlus: a603035
- License data: EU EMA: by INN
- Pregnancy category: AU: B3
- Routes of administration: By mouth
- ATC code: G04BE09 (WHO)

Legal status
- Legal status: AU: S4 (Prescription only); UK: POM (Prescription only); US: ℞-only; In general: ℞ (Prescription only)

Pharmacokinetic data
- Bioavailability: 15%
- Protein binding: 95%
- Metabolism: Liver (CYP3A4)
- Elimination half-life: 4–5 hours
- Excretion: Bile duct

Identifiers
- IUPAC name: 4-[2-Ethoxy-5-(4-ethylpiperazin-1-yl)sulfonyl-phenyl]-9-methyl-7-propyl-3,5,6,8-tetrazabicyclo[4.3.0]nona-3,7,9-trien-2-one
- CAS Number: 224785-90-4
- PubChem CID: 110634
- IUPHAR/BPS: 7320
- DrugBank: DB00862
- ChemSpider: 99300
- UNII: UCE6F4125H
- KEGG: D08668
- ChEMBL: ChEMBL1520
- CompTox Dashboard (EPA): DTXSID3048318
- ECHA InfoCard: 100.112.672

Chemical and physical data
- Formula: C_{23}H_{32}N_{6}O_{4}S
- Molar mass: 488.61 g·mol^{−1}
- 3D model (JSmol): Interactive image
- SMILES: O=C2\N=C(/Nn1c(nc(c12)C)CCC)c3cc(ccc3OCC)S(=O)(=O)N4CCN(CC)CC4
- InChI: InChI=1S/C23H32N6O4S/c1-5-8-20-24-16(4)21-23(30)25-22(26-29(20)21)18-15-17(9-10-19(18)33-7-3)34(31,32)28-13-11-27(6-2)12-14-28/h9-10,15H,5-8,11-14H2,1-4H3,(H,25,26,30); Key:SECKRCOLJRRGGV-UHFFFAOYSA-N

Vardenafil 4 tablets Blister 20 mg

Vardenafil, sold under the brand name Levitra among others, is a medication that is used for treating erectile dysfunction. It is a PDE5 inhibitor. It is taken by mouth.

== Medical uses ==
Vardenafil's indications and contraindications are the same as with other PDE5 inhibitors; it is closely related in function to sildenafil citrate (Viagra) and tadalafil (Cialis). The difference between the vardenafil molecule and sildenafil citrate is a nitrogen atom's position and the change of sildenafil's piperazine ring methyl group to an ethyl group. Tadalafil is structurally different from both sildenafil and vardenafil. Vardenafil's relatively short effective time is comparable to but somewhat longer than sildenafil's. Despite the structural differences between vardenafil and sildenafil, they both show similar ocular side effects due to their similar selectivity overlap with PDE6, an enzyme found in the eye.

Beyond its indications for erectile dysfunction, vardenafil may be effective in the treatment of premature ejaculation, where it may significantly increase the time from penetration to ejaculation.

== Adverse reactions ==
The common, adverse drug reactions (side effects) are the same as with other PDE5 inhibitors. The frequent vardenafil-specific side-effect is nausea; the infrequent side effects are abdominal pain, back pain, photosensitivity, abnormal vision, eye pain, facial edema, hypotension, palpitation, tachycardia, arthralgia, myalgia, rash, itch, and priapism.

One possibly serious, but rare, side effect with vardenafil is heart attack. Also, in rare cases, vardenafil use may cause priapism, a very painful emergency condition that can cause impotence if left untreated.

In October 2007, the U.S. Food and Drug Administration (FDA) announced that a warning about possible deafness (sudden hearing loss) would be added to the drug labels of vardenafil, and other PDE5 inhibitors.

== Interactions ==
Vardenafil should not be used by people taking nitrate medications, because combining them with vardenafil might provoke potentially life-threatening hypotension (low blood pressure).

Further, vardenafil causes lengthening of the QT interval. Therefore, it should not be taken by people taking other medications that affect the QT interval (such as amiodarone).

== History ==
Vardenafil was co-marketed by Bayer Pharmaceuticals, GlaxoSmithKline, and Schering-Plough under the brand name Levitra. As of 2005, the co-promotion rights of GSK on Levitra have been returned to Bayer in many markets outside the US. In Italy, Bayer sells vardenafil as Levitra and GSK sells it as Vivanza. Thus, because of European Union trade rules, parallel imports might result in Vivanza sold next to Levitra in the EU.

An orally disintegrating form, marketed as Staxyn and Levitra Soft, has been gaining approvals in countries such as the United States and Canada.

== Tainted supplements ==
The US Food and Drug Administration (FDA) has found vardenafil and other synthetic PDE5 inhibitors in numerous products marketed as "herbal" supplements or "all natural" products for male enhancement.
