= List of phosphodiesterase inhibitors =

The following is a list of phosphodiesterase inhibitors.

== List ==
1. Adibendan
2. Aminophylline
3. Aminophylline dihydrate
4. Amipizone
5. Apremilast
6. Arofylline
7. Atizoram
8. Befuraline
9. Bemarinone hydrochloride
10. Bemoradan
11. Benafentrine
12. Bucladesine
13. Buflomedil
14. Buquineran
15. CC-1088
16. Carbazeran
17. Catramilast
18. Cilomilast
19. Cilostamide
20. Cilostazol
21. Cipamfylline
22. Crisaborole
23. Daxalipram
24. Denbufylline
25. Difamilast
26. Dimabefylline
27. Diniprofylline
28. Dipyridamole
29. Doxofylline
30. Drotaverine
31. Dyphylline
32. Enoximone
33. Etamiphyllin
34. Etofylline
35. Filaminast
36. Flufylline
37. Fluprofylline
38. Furafylline
39. Imazodan
40. Imazodan hydrochloride
41. Inamrinone
42. Inamrinone lactate
43. Isbufylline
44. Lirimilast
45. Lisofylline
46. Lomifylline
47. Medorinone
48. Metescufylline
49. Midaxifylline
50. Milrinone
51. Milrinone lactate
52. Motapizone
53. Nanterinone
54. Nestifylline
55. Nitraquazone
56. Oglemilast
57. Oglemilast Sodium
58. Olprinone
59. Oxagrelate
60. Oxtriphylline
61. Papaverine
62. Papaverine hydrochloride
63. Papaverine sulfate
64. Parogrelil
65. Pelrinone hydrochloride
66. Pentifylline
67. Pentoxifylline
68. Perbufylline
69. Piclamilast
70. Pimefylline
71. Pimobendan
72. Piroximone
73. Prinoxodan
74. Proxyphylline
75. Pumafentrine
76. Quazinone
77. Quazodine
78. Revamilast
79. Revizinone
80. Roflumilast
81. Rolipram
82. Ronomilast
83. Saterinone
84. Senazodan
85. Siguazodan
86. Tetomilast
87. Tofimilast
88. Trapidil
89. Vesnarinone
90. Zardaverine

=== cGMP phosphodiesterase inhibitors ===
1. Aminotadalafil
2. Avanafil
3. Beminafil
4. Dasantafil
5. Gisadenafil
6. Gisadenafil besylate
7. Mirodenafil
8. Sildenafil
9. Sildenafil citrate
10. Tadalafil
11. Udenafil
12. Vardenafil
13. Vardenafil dihydrochloride
14. Vardenafil hydrochloride trihydrate
15. Zaprinast

== See also ==
- Phosphodiesterase inhibitor

== Sources ==
- This list was created from the NCI Thesaurus.
