= PDE4 inhibitor =

Class of chemical compounds

Rolipram, the prototypical PDE4 inhibitor

A phosphodiesterase-4 inhibitor, commonly referred to as a PDE4 inhibitor, is a drug used to block the degradative action of phosphodiesterase 4 (PDE4) on cyclic adenosine monophosphate (cAMP). It is a member of the larger family of PDE inhibitors. The PDE4 family of enzymes are the most prevalent PDE in immune cells. They are predominantly responsible for hydrolyzing cAMP within both immune cells and cells in the central nervous system.

== Therapeutic utility ==
The prototypical PDE4 inhibitor is rolipram. PDE4 inhibitors are known to possess procognitive (including long term memory-improving), wakefulness-promoting, neuroprotective, and anti-inflammatory effects. Consequently, PDE4 inhibitors have been investigated as treatments for a diverse group of different diseases, including central nervous system disorders such as major depressive disorder (clinical depression), anxiety disorders, schizophrenia, Parkinson's disease, Alzheimer's disease, multiple sclerosis, Huntington's disease, stroke and inflammatory conditions such as chronic obstructive pulmonary disease (COPD), asthma and rheumatoid arthritis.

PDE4D inhibition, along with PDE4A inhibition also appears to be responsible for the antidepressant effects of PDE4 inhibitors. Similarly PDE4B inhibition appears to be required for the antipsychotic effects of PDE4 inhibitors, in line with this view PDE4B polymorphisms and altered gene expression in the central nervous system have been associated with schizophrenia and bipolar disorder in a postmortem study. PDE4 also regulates the D_{1}/PKA/DARPP-32 signalling cascade in the frontal cortex, which may contribute to the antipsychotic and procognitive effects of PDE4 inhibitors. Whereas PDE4C is expressed primarily in the periphery and hence may be partly responsible for the peripheral effects of PDE4 inhibitors (e.g. their anti-inflammatory effects). PDE4 inhibition is also known to attenuate ethanol seeking and consumption in rats, hence suggesting its possible utility in the treatment of alcohol dependence. Indeed, one experiment has found that intake of a PDE4 oral medication for psoriasis has significantly reduced alcohol consumption in serious human drinkers compared with those taking the placebo. A few different lines of evidence suggests the therapeutic utility in the treatment of brain tumours.

The clinical development of PDE4 inhibitors has been hampered by their potent emetic effects, which appear to be related to their inhibition of PDE4D which is expressed in the area postrema.

== Adverse reactions ==
Nausea, vomiting, and related general gastrointestinal side effects are the most commonly implicated side effects of PDE4 inhibitors. Other possible side effects include respiratory and urinary tract infections, which have been discovered from the clinical use of roflumilast.

== Examples ==
- Apremilast, a phthalimide derivative that was approved by the U.S. FDA in March 2014 for use as a treatment for psoriatic arthritis, and in September 2014 for the treatment of plaque psoriasis under the brand name Otezla.
- Caffeine is a weak, non-selective PDE inhibitor. A metabolite of caffeine, theophylline, is a more potent PDE inhibitor.
- Cilomilast, in clinical development by GlaxoSmithKline for treatment of COPD.
- Crisaborole (AN2728), a boron-containing drug for the topical treatment of psoriasis and atopic dermatitis. It was approved by the FDA on December 14, 2016 under the brand name Eucrisa for the treatment of mild-to-moderate atopic dermatitis (eczema) in patients 2 years of age and older.
- Diazepam, a benzodiazepine anxiolytic, amnesic, hypnotic, sedative and muscle relaxant.
- Difamilast: PDE4B inhibitor
- Drotaverine
- Ensifentrine
- Glaucine, an aporphine alkaloid, low-potency PDE4 inhibitor, calcium channel blocker, dopamine antagonist and 5-HT2A positive allosteric modulator, used as antitussive in Eastern Europe and Iceland.
- Ibudilast, a neuroprotective and bronchodilator drug used mainly in the treatment of asthma and stroke. It inhibits PDE4 to the greatest extent, but also shows significant inhibition of other PDE subtypes, and so acts as a selective PDE4 inhibitor or a non-selective phosphodiesterase inhibitor, depending on the dose.
- Luteolin, supplement extracted from peanuts and other plants that also possesses IGF-1 properties.
- Mesembrenone, an alkaloid from the herb Sceletium tortuosum (Kanna).
- Mesembrine, an alkaloid present in Sceletium tortuosum (kanna).
- MRM3379: PDE4D inhibitor
- Mufemilast
- Nerandomilast: PDE4B inhibitor
- Piclamilast, a more potent inhibitor than rolipram.
- Roflumilast, licensed for the treatment of severe chronic obstructive pulmonary disease in the EU, Russia and U.S. by Merck & Co. under the trade names Daxas and Daliresp, and for the treatment of plaque psoriasis under the brand name Zoryve.
- Rolipram, used as investigative tool in pharmacological research.
- Zatolmilast: PDE4D inhibitor
- Orismilast: PDE 4B/4D dual inhibitor
- Revamilast: PDE4B inhibitor

== Mode of action ==
PDE4 hydrolyzes cyclic adenosine monophosphate (cAMP) to inactive adenosine monophosphate (AMP). Inhibition of PDE4 blocks hydrolysis of cAMP, thereby increasing levels of cAMP within cells.

== See also ==
- Development of analogs of thalidomide
- Forskolin
