= PDE4A =

Protein-coding gene in the species Homo sapiens

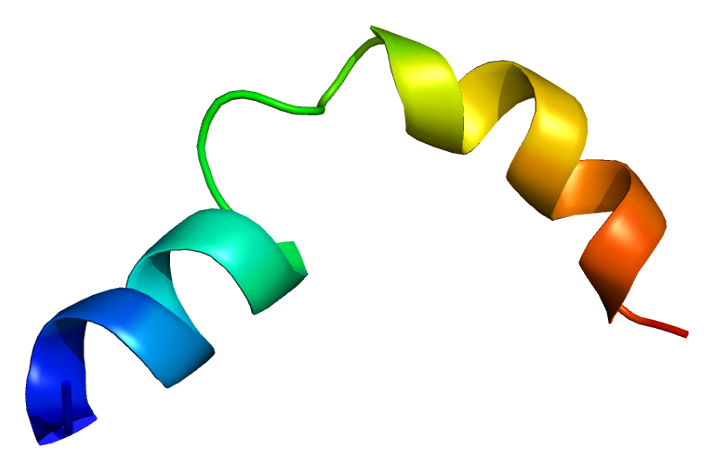
Available structures
| PDB | Ortholog search: PDBe RCSB |
| PDB | List of PDB id codes 2QYK, 3I8V, 3TVX |

Identifiers
- Aliases: PDE4A, DPDE2, PDE4, PDE46, phosphodiesterase 4A
- External IDs: OMIM: 600126; MGI: 99558; HomoloGene: 4520; GeneCards: PDE4A; OMA:PDE4A - orthologs

Gene location (Human)
| Chr. | Chromosome 19 (human) |
| Band | 19p13.2 | Start | 10,416,773 bp |
| Band | 19p13.2 | End | 10,469,630 bp |

Gene location (Mouse)
| Chr. | Chromosome 9 (mouse) |
| Band | 9 A3|9 7.73 cM | Start | 21,077,010 bp |
| Band | 9 A3|9 7.73 cM | End | 21,124,544 bp |
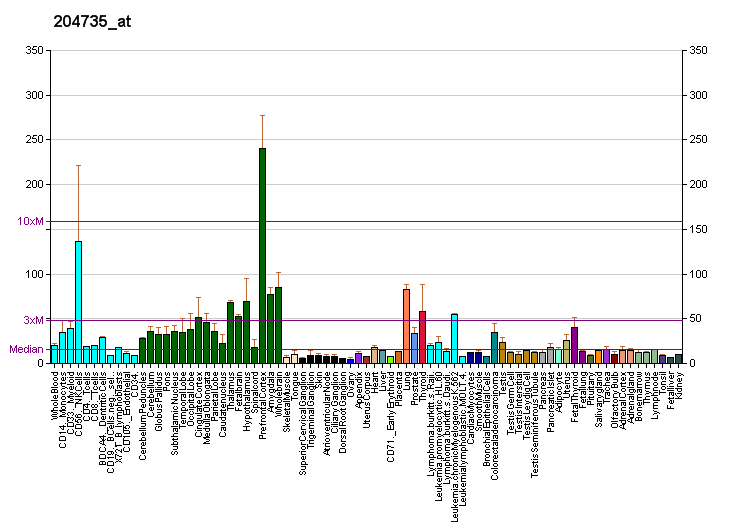

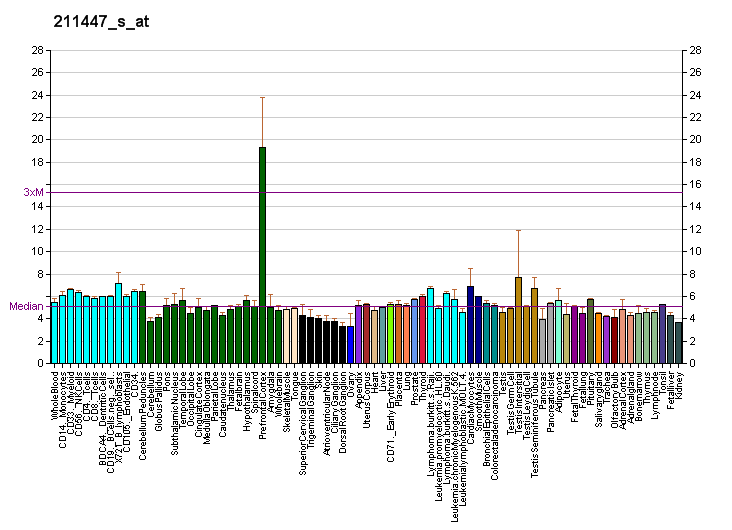

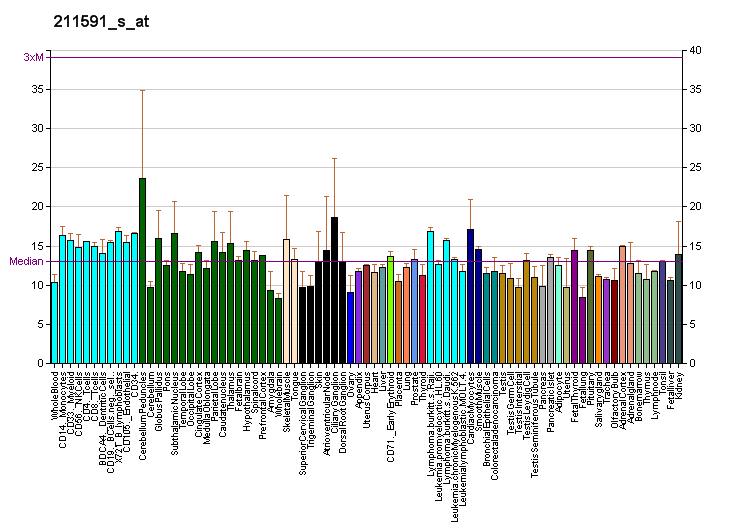
RNA expression pattern
| Bgee | Human / Mouse (ortholog); Top expressed in: pancreatic ductal cell; lateral nuclear group of thalamus; parietal lobe; postcentral gyrus; primary visual cortex; superior frontal gyrus; right frontal lobe; muscle of thigh; cingulate gyrus; anterior cingulate cortex / Top expressed in: superior frontal gyrus; primary visual cortex; dentate gyrus of hippocampal formation granule cell; spermatid; muscle of thigh; seminiferous tubule; cerebellar cortex; right ventricle; olfactory epithelium; lumbar subsegment of spinal cord; More reference expression data |
| BioGPS | More reference expression data |
Gene ontology
| Molecular function | phosphoric diester hydrolase activity; cAMP binding; protein binding; hydrolase activity; 3',5'-cyclic-nucleotide phosphodiesterase activity; metal ion binding; 3',5'-cyclic-AMP phosphodiesterase activity |
| Cellular component | cytoplasm; ruffle membrane; perinuclear region of cytoplasm; cytosol; cell projection; membrane; nucleoplasm; plasma membrane |
| Biological process | sensory perception of smell; regulation of cAMP-mediated signaling; cAMP catabolic process; regulation of protein kinase A signaling; signal transduction; G protein-coupled receptor signaling pathway |
Sources:Amigo / QuickGO
Orthologs
| Species | Human | Mouse |
| Entrez | 5141 | 18577 |
| Ensembl | ENSG00000065989 | ENSMUSG00000032177 |
| UniProt | P27815 | O89084 |
| RefSeq (mRNA) | NM_001111307; NM_001111308; NM_001111309; NM_001243121; NM_006202 | NM_019798; NM_183408; NM_001310750 |
| RefSeq (protein) | NP_001104777; NP_001104778; NP_001104779; NP_001230050; NP_006193 | NP_001297679; NP_062772; NP_899668 |
| Location (UCSC) | Chr 19: 10.42 – 10.47 Mb | Chr 9: 21.08 – 21.12 Mb |
| PubMed search |
- Wikidata
| View/Edit Human | View/Edit Mouse |

cAMP-specific 3',5'-cyclic phosphodiesterase 4A is an enzyme that in humans is encoded by the PDE4A gene.

== Function ==
The protein encoded by this gene belongs to the cyclic nucleotide phosphodiesterase (PDE) family, and PDE4 subfamily. This PDE hydrolyzes the secondary messenger, cAMP, which is a regulator and mediator of a number of cellular responses to extracellular signals. Thus, by regulating the cellular concentration of cAMP, this protein plays a key role in many important physiological processes. Recently, it has been shown through the use of PDE4A knock out mice that PDE4A may play a role in the regulation of anxiety and emotional memory.

== Clinical significance ==
PDE4A inhibition is a target of a number of drugs including:

- rolipram (antidepressant and antiinflammatory) and cilomilast (antiinflammatory) – inhibits PDE4A isoforms 1, 2, 6, and 7
- roflumilast (antiinflammatory) – inhibits PDE4A isoforms 1, 2, and 6
- tofisopam (anxiolytic with alleged antiinflammatory properties) – inhibits PDE4A isoform 1, PDE-10A1, PDE-3, and PDE-2A3
