= Filaminast =

Chemical compound

Clinical data
- ATC code: None

Legal status
- Legal status: Development terminated

Identifiers
- IUPAC name: [(E)-1-(3-Cyclopentyloxy-4-methoxyphenyl)ethylideneamino] carbamate
- CAS Number: 141184-34-1
- PubChem CID: 9578243
- DrugBank: DB02660
- ChemSpider: 7852607
- UNII: CDD69JC61J
- KEGG: D04185
- CompTox Dashboard (EPA): DTXSID80869910

Chemical and physical data
- Formula: C_{15}H_{20}N_{2}O_{4}
- Molar mass: 292.335 g·mol^{−1}
- 3D model (JSmol): Interactive image
- SMILES: CC(=NOC(=O)N)C1=CC(=C(C=C1)OC)OC2CCCC2

Filaminast (code name WAY-PDA 641) was a drug candidate developed by Wyeth-Ayerst. It is a phosphodiesterase 4 inhibitor (PDE4 inhibitor) and an analog of rolipram, which served as a prototype molecule for several development efforts. It was discontinued after a Phase II trial showed that its therapeutic window was too narrow; it could not be dosed high enough without causing significant side effects (nausea and vomiting), which was a problem with the rolipram class of molecules.

== See also ==
- Piclamilast
- Roflumilast
