= Indolidan =

Cardiotonic molecule

Clinical data
- Other names: LY195115

Identifiers
- IUPAC name: 3,3-Dimethyl-5-(6-oxo-4,5-dihydro-1H-pyridazin-3-yl)-1H-indol-2-one
- CAS Number: 100643-96-7
- PubChem CID: 5284402
- ChemSpider: 4447476
- UNII: 0751ZOW7OR
- KEGG: D04529
- ChEMBL: ChEMBL38224
- CompTox Dashboard (EPA): DTXSID0020739

Chemical and physical data
- Formula: C_{14}H_{15}N_{3}O_{2}
- Molar mass: 257.293 g·mol^{−1}
- 3D model (JSmol): Interactive image
- SMILES: CC1(C2=C(C=CC(=C2)C3=NNC(=O)CC3)NC1=O)C
- InChI: InChI=1S/C14H15N3O2/c1-14(2)9-7-8(3-4-11(9)15-13(14)19)10-5-6-12(18)17-16-10/h3-4,7H,5-6H2,1-2H3,(H,15,19)(H,17,18); Key:LZCQFJKUAIWHRW-UHFFFAOYSA-N

Indolidan is a small-molecule cardiotonic agent originally developed by Eli Lilly & Co. for the treatment of heart failure. Structurally classified as a 2-indolinone derivative, it acts primarily as a selective inhibitor of phosphodiesterase 3 (PDE3), thereby enhancing cardiac contractility by increasing intracellular cyclic AMP (cAMP) levels in cardiac myocytes. Indolidan has been investigated in clinical settings for its potential to improve cardiac output in patients with heart failure, but development has not advanced beyond early-phase clinical trials due to concerns about safety and overall efficacy.

Indolidan belongs to a class or family of chemicals that contain a pyridazinone ring. For example, it is structurally related to Levosimendan, pimobendan, siguazodan, zardaverine.

== Synthesis ==

A Friedel–Crafts acylation of 3,3-dimethyloxindole [19155-24-9] (4) with succinic anhydride (5) afforded 5-(3,3-dimethyloxindole)-4-oxobutyric acid, PC13620376 (6). Treatment with hydrazine afforded the pyridazinone ring closure, thus completing the synthesis of indolidan (7) proper.

An alternative way to create 3,3-dimethyloxindole (4) starting material is from N'-phenylisobutyrohydrazide [5461-50-7]. Intramolecular ring closure is made to occur upon heating in calcium hydride.

A radiolabelled synthesis with carbon-14 and deuterium has also been described.

== See also ==
- Adibendan also uses 3,3-dimethyloxindole starting material.
