= C18H24N2O3 =

The molecular formula C_{18}H_{24}N_{2}O_{3} (molar mass: 316.401 g/mol) may refer to:

- Atizoram
- RTI-160
