= 8-Methoxymethyl-3-isobutyl-1-methylxanthine =

Names
- IUPAC name 8-(Methoxymethyl)-1-methyl-3-(2-methylpropyl)-7H-purine-2,6-dione
- Other names 8-Methoxymethyl-IBMX; MMPX

Identifiers
CAS Number	78033-08-6
3D model (JSmol)	Interactive image
ChemSpider	137239
PubChem CID	155806
UNII	67FPZ87JKY
CompTox Dashboard (EPA)	DTXSID30228679
- InChI: InChI=1S/C12H18N4O3/c1-7(2)5-16-10-9(11(17)15(3)12(16)18)13-8(14-10)6-19-4/h7H,5-6H2,1-4H3,(H,13,14) Key: NBLBCGUCPBXKOV-UHFFFAOYSA-N
- SMILES: CC(C)CN1C2=C(C(=O)N(C1=O)C)NC(=N2)COC

Properties
Chemical formula	C_{12}H_{18}N_{4}O_{3}
Molar mass	266.301 g·mol^{−1}
- Except where otherwise noted, data are given for materials in their standard state (at 25 °C [77 °F], 100 kPa). Infobox references

8-Methoxymethyl-3-isobutyl-1-methylxanthine (MMPX) is a phosphodiesterase inhibitor.
