= SCH-51866 =

Names
- IUPAC name (6aR,9aS)-5-Methyl-2-[4-(trifluoromethyl)benzyl]-5,6a,7,8,9,9a-hexahydrocyclopenta[4,5]imidazo[2,1-b]purin-4(3H)-one

Identifiers
CAS Number	167298-74-0
3D model (JSmol)	Interactive image
ChemSpider	26377910
IUPHAR/BPS	5270
PubChem CID	15473392
UNII	F8GU4PSP29
- InChI: InChI=1S/C19H18F3N5O/c1-26-17(28)15-16(27-13-4-2-3-12(13)23-18(26)27)25-14(24-15)9-10-5-7-11(8-6-10)19(20,21)22/h5-8,12-13H,2-4,9H2,1H3,(H,24,25)/t12-,13+/m1/s1 Key: JOSMPBVYYKRYLG-OLZOCXBDSA-N
- SMILES: CN1C(=O)C2=C(N=C(N2)CC3=CC=C(C=C3)C(F)(F)F)N4C1=N[C@H]5[C@@H]4CCC5

Properties
Chemical formula	C_{19}H_{18}F_{3}N_{5}O
Molar mass	389.382 g·mol^{−1}
- Except where otherwise noted, data are given for materials in their standard state (at 25 °C [77 °F], 100 kPa). Infobox references

SCH-51866 is a phosphodiesterase inhibitor.
