= ZSP1601 =

Experimental drug

Legal status
- Legal status: Investigational

Identifiers
- IUPAC name: 7-(Cyclopropylmethyl)-3,7-dihydro-1-[(cis-4-hydroxy-4-methylcyclohexyl)methyl]-3-methyl-1H-purine-2,6-dione
- CAS Number: 1900710-71-5

Chemical and physical data
- Formula: C_{18}H_{26}N_{4}O_{3}
- Molar mass: 346.431 g·mol^{−1}
- 3D model (JSmol): Interactive image
- SMILES: C(N1C2=C(N(C)C(=O)N(C[C@@H]3CC[C@](C)(O)CC3)C2=O)N=C1)C4CC4

ZSP1601 is an experimental pan-phosphodiesterase inhibitor developed by Guangdong Raynovent Biotech for nonalcoholic steatohepatitis.
