= ICI-63197 =

Names
- Preferred IUPAC name 2-Amino-6-methyl-4-propyl[1,2,4]triazolo[1,5-a]pyrimidin-5(4H)-one

Identifiers
CAS Number	27277-00-5
3D model (JSmol)	Interactive image
ChemSpider	56558
ECHA InfoCard	100.043.970
EC Number	248-383-5
PubChem CID	62824
UNII	015G4I43YD
CompTox Dashboard (EPA)	DTXSID6041391
- InChI: InChI=1S/C9H13N5O/c1-3-4-13-7(15)6(2)5-14-9(13)11-8(10)12-14/h5H,3-4H2,1-2H3,(H2,10,12) Key: UQDVRVNMIJAGRK-UHFFFAOYSA-N; InChI=1/C9H13N5O/c1-3-4-13-7(15)6(2)5-14-9(13)11-8(10)12-14/h5H,3-4H2,1-2H3,(H2,10,12) Key: UQDVRVNMIJAGRK-UHFFFAOYAG
- SMILES: CCCN1C(=O)C(=CN2C1=NC(=N2)N)C

Properties
Chemical formula	C_{9}H_{13}N_{5}O
Molar mass	207.237 g·mol^{−1}
- Except where otherwise noted, data are given for materials in their standard state (at 25 °C [77 °F], 100 kPa). Infobox references

ICI-63197 is a phosphodiesterase inhibitor.
