= C12H12N4O3 =

Molecular formula

The molecular formula C_{12}H_{12}N_{4}O_{3} (molar mass: 260.25 g/mol, exact mass: 260.0909 u) may refer to:

- Benznidazole
- Furafylline
