= C20H25NO4 =

The molecular formulas C_{20}H_{25}NO_{4} (molar mass: 343.41 g/mol) may refer to:

- Acetyldihydrocodeine
- Cilomilast, a treatment of respiratory disorders
- 14-Ethoxymetopon
- 6β-Naltrexol
