= CC-1088 =

Skeletal formula

CC-1088 is a thalidomide analogue inhibitor of phosphodiesterase 4 that was being developed up to 2005 by Celgene Corp., for treating of inflammatory diseases and myelodysplastic syndromes. Apremilast (CC-10004) was found to be a preferable.

== See also ==
- Apremilast
- Development of analogs of thalidomide
