= Quazinone =

Chemical compound

Clinical data
- Other names: Ro 13-6438
- Routes of administration: Oral
- ATC code: None

Legal status
- Legal status: In general: ℞ (Prescription only)

Identifiers
- IUPAC name: (3R)-6-Chloro-3-methyl-5,10-dihydroimidazo[2,1-b]quinazolin-2(3H)-one
- CAS Number: 70018-51-8
- PubChem CID: 6603980
- ChemSpider: 5036286
- UNII: D1Q7F6C2FP
- KEGG: D05668
- CompTox Dashboard (EPA): DTXSID6045795

Chemical and physical data
- Formula: C_{11}H_{10}ClN_{3}O
- Molar mass: 235.67 g·mol^{−1}
- 3D model (JSmol): Interactive image
- SMILES: Clc1cccc3c1CN2/C(=N\C(=O)[C@H]2C)N3

Quazinone (Dozonone) is a cardiotonic and vasodilator drug which was developed and marketed in the 1980s for the treatment of heart disease. It acts as a selective PDE3 inhibitor. It is no longer available.

== See also ==
- Phosphodiesterase inhibitor
