= Mufemilast =

Chemical compound

Clinical data
- Other names: Hemay005

Legal status
- Legal status: Investigational

Identifiers
- IUPAC name: N-[5-[(1S)-1-(3-ethoxy-4-methoxyphenyl)-2-methylsulfonylethyl]-4,6-dioxothieno[3,4-c]pyrrol-3-yl]acetamide
- CAS Number: 1255909-03-5
- PubChem CID: 137355584
- ChemSpider: 115010424
- UNII: 4QX9BK9E7P
- ChEMBL: ChEMBL5095240

Chemical and physical data
- Formula: C_{20}H_{22}N_{2}O_{7}S_{2}
- Molar mass: 466.52 g·mol^{−1}
- 3D model (JSmol): Interactive image
- SMILES: CCOC1=C(C=CC(=C1)[C@@H](CS(=O)(=O)C)N2C(=O)C3=CSC(=C3C2=O)NC(=O)C)OC
- InChI: InChI=1S/C20H22N2O7S2/c1-5-29-16-8-12(6-7-15(16)28-3)14(10-31(4,26)27)22-19(24)13-9-30-18(21-11(2)23)17(13)20(22)25/h6-9,14H,5,10H2,1-4H3,(H,21,23)/t14-/m1/s1; Key:PRSNGWLHNWGOKD-CQSZACIVSA-N

Mufemilast (Hemay005) is a small-molecule inhibitor of phosphodiesterase 4. It is developed by Hemay Pharmaceutical for psoriasis.
