= Piclamilast =

Chemical compound

Clinical data
- ATC code: None

Identifiers
- IUPAC name: 3-(Cyclopentyloxy)-N-(3,5-dichloropyridin-4-yl)-4-methoxybenzamide
- CAS Number: 144035-83-6
- PubChem CID: 154575
- DrugBank: EXPT02600
- ChemSpider: 136184
- UNII: WM58D7C3ZT
- KEGG: D05474
- ChEBI: CHEBI:47619
- ChEMBL: ChEMBL42126
- CompTox Dashboard (EPA): DTXSID3040227
- ECHA InfoCard: 100.229.714

Chemical and physical data
- Formula: C_{18}H_{18}Cl_{2}N_{2}O_{3}
- Molar mass: 381.25 g·mol^{−1}
- 3D model (JSmol): Interactive image
- SMILES: COC1=C(C=C(C=C1)C(=O)NC2=C(C=NC=C2Cl)Cl)OC3CCCC3
- InChI: InChI=1S/C18H18Cl2N2O3/c1-24-15-7-6-11(8-16(15)25-12-4-2-3-5-12)18(23)22-17-13(19)9-21-10-14(17)20/h6-10,12H,2-5H2,1H3,(H,21,22,23); Key:RRRUXBQSQLKHEL-UHFFFAOYSA-N

Piclamilast (RP 73401), is a selective PDE4 inhibitor. It is comparable to other PDE4 inhibitors for its anti-inflammatory effects. It has been investigated for its applications to the treatment of conditions such as chronic obstructive pulmonary disease, bronchopulmonary dysplasia and asthma. It is a second generation compound that exhibits structural functionalities of the PDE4 inhibitors cilomilast and roflumilast. The structure for piclamilast was first elucidated in a 1995 European patent application. The earliest mention of the name "piclamilast" was used in a 1997 publication.

== Pharmacology ==
Piclamilast functions through the selective inhibition of the four PDE4 isoforms (PDE4A-D). It shows no inhibition of the other PDEs. The PDE4 isoforms are especially important to inflammatory and immunomodulatory cells. They are the most common PDE in inflammatory cells such as mast cells, neutrophils, basophils, eosinophils, T lymphocytes, macrophages, and structural cells such as sensory nerves and epithelial cells. PDE4 hydrolyzes cyclic adenosine monophosphate (cAMP) to inactive adenosine monophosphate (AMP). Inhibition of PDE4 blocks hydrolysis of cAMP thereby increasing levels of cAMP within cells. cAMP suppresses the activity of immune and inflammatory cells.

PDE4 inhibition in an induced chronic lung disease murine model was shown to have anti-inflammatory properties, attenuate pulmonary fibrin deposition and vascular alveolar leakage, and prolong survival in hyperoxia-induced neonatal lung injury. A study of PDE4 inhibition in a murine model of allergic asthma showed that piclamilast significantly improves the pulmonary function, airway inflammation and goblet cell hyperplasia.

== Side effects ==
Vomiting is the most commonly cited side effect of piclamilast. It has proven difficult to separate the emetic side effects from the therapeutic benefits of several PDE4 inhibitors, including piclamilast.
