= EHNA =

Chemical compound

Identifiers
- IUPAC name: 3-(6-aminopurin-9-yl)nonan-2-ol
- CAS Number: 59262-86-1
- PubChem CID: 3206
- ChemSpider: 3094
- UNII: PYH33UX4HM
- ChEMBL: ChEMBL50378
- CompTox Dashboard (EPA): DTXSID70110044

Chemical and physical data
- Formula: C_{14}H_{23}N_{5}O
- Molar mass: 277.372 g·mol^{−1}
- 3D model (JSmol): Interactive image
- SMILES: CCCCCCC(C(C)O)n1cnc2c1ncnc2N
- InChI: InChI=1S/C14H23N5O/c1-3-4-5-6-7-11(10(2)20)19-9-18-12-13(15)16-8-17-14(12)19/h8-11,20H,3-7H2,1-2H3,(H2,15,16,17); Key:IOSAAWHGJUZBOG-UHFFFAOYSA-N

EHNA (erythro-9-(2-hydroxy-3-nonly)adenine) is a potent adenosine deaminase inhibitor, which also acts as a phosphodiesterase inhibitor that selectively inhibits phosphodiesterase type 2 (PDE2).
