= PDE4B =

Protein-coding gene in humans

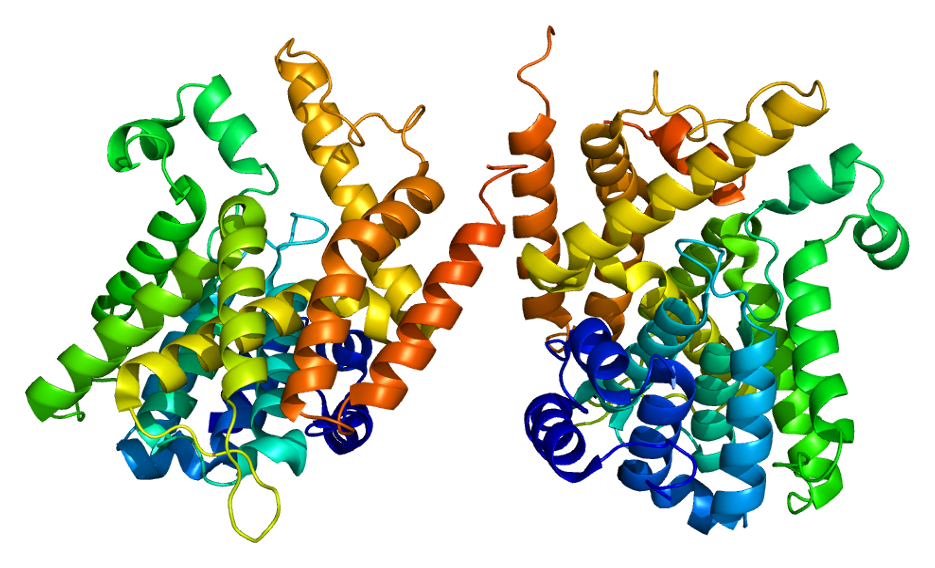

Identifiers
- Aliases: PDE4B, DPDE4, PDEIVB, phosphodiesterase 4B
- External IDs: OMIM: 600127; MGI: 99557; GeneCards: PDE4B
Available structures
PDB	Human UniProt search: PDBe RCSB
PDB	List of PDB id codes 1F0J, 1RO6, 1RO9, 1ROR, 1TB5, 1XLX, 1XLZ, 1XM4, 1XM6, 1XMU, 1XMY, 1XN0, 1XOS, 1XOT, 1Y2H, 1Y2J, 2CHM, 2QYL, 3D3P, 3FRG, 3G45, 3GWT, 3HC8, 3HDZ, 3HMV, 3KKT, 3LY2, 3O0J, 3O56, 3O57, 3W5E, 3WD9, 4KP6, 4MYQ, 4NW7, 4WZI, 4X0F
Enzyme activity
EC #	BRENDA	ExPASy	KEGG	MetaCyc
3.1.4.53	↗	↗	↗	↗

Gene location (Human)
Chr.	Chromosome 1 (human)
Band	1p31.3	Start	65,792,514 bp
Band	1p31.3	End	66,374,579 bp

Gene location (Mouse)
Chr.	Chromosome 4 (mouse)
Band	4 C6|4 46.99 cM	Start	101,944,740 bp
Band	4 C6|4 46.99 cM	End	102,464,456 bp
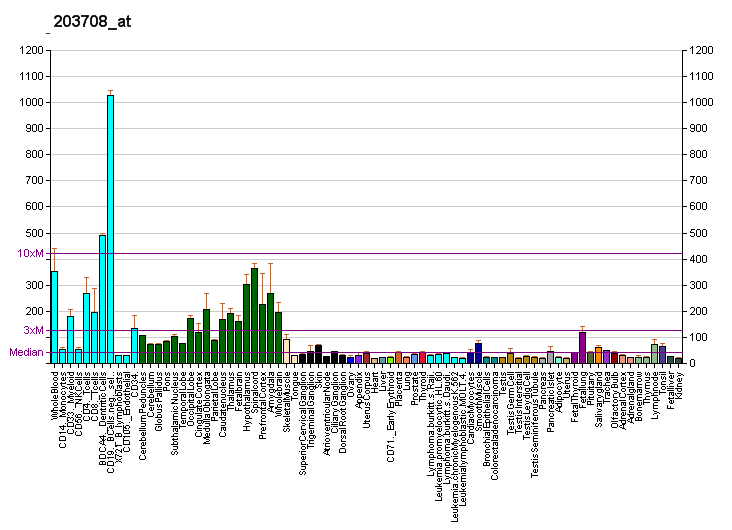

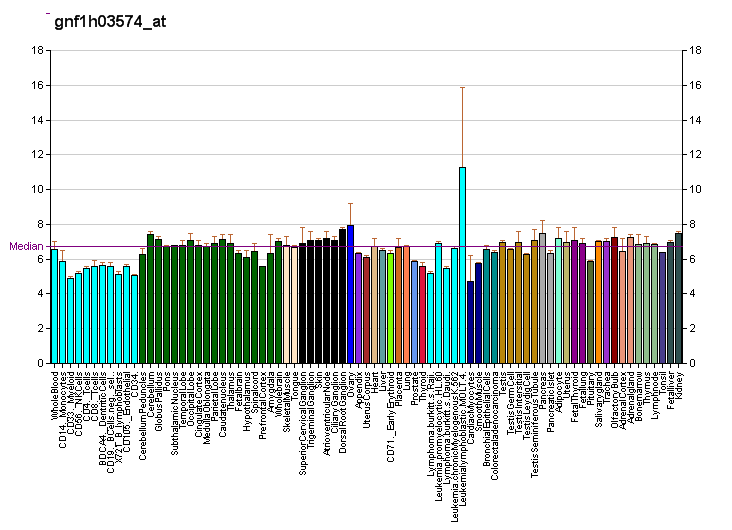

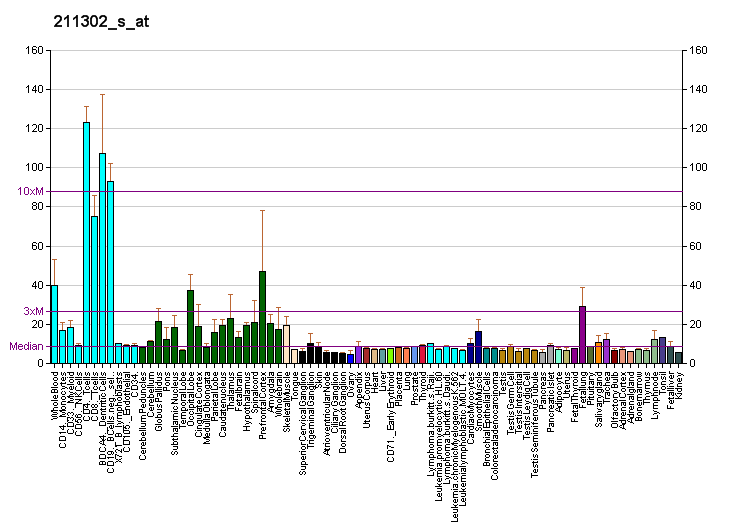
RNA expression pattern
Bgee	Human / Mouse (ortholog); Top expressed in: corpus callosum; cartilage tissue; subthalamic nucleus; inferior ganglion of vagus nerve; superior vestibular nucleus; ventral tegmental area; external globus pallidus; middle temporal gyrus; pars reticulata; pons / Top expressed in: left lung lobe; nucleus accumbens; olfactory tubercle; supraoptic nucleus; dorsal striatum; triceps brachii muscle; muscle of thigh; medial head of gastrocnemius muscle; temporal muscle; vastus lateralis muscle; More reference expression data
BioGPS	More reference expression data
Gene ontology
Molecular function	metal ion binding; 3',5'-cyclic-nucleotide phosphodiesterase activity; hydrolase activity; cAMP binding; gamma-tubulin binding; transmembrane transporter binding; phosphoric diester hydrolase activity; 3',5'-cyclic-AMP phosphodiesterase activity; protein binding
Cellular component	voltage-gated calcium channel complex; gamma-tubulin complex; cell periphery; cytosol; postsynaptic density; dendritic spine; membrane; centrosome; Z discdkac; excitatory synapse; synaptic vesicle
Biological process	regulation of high voltage-gated calcium channel activity; neutrophil homeostasis; regulation of cardiac muscle cell contraction; positive regulation of interferon-gamma production; signal transduction; cellular response to lipopolysaccharide; positive regulation of interleukin-2 production; leukocyte migration; negative regulation of relaxation of cardiac muscle; cellular response to epinephrine stimulus; T cell receptor signaling pathway; neutrophil chemotaxis; cAMP catabolic process; G protein-coupled receptor signaling pathway
Sources:Amigo / QuickGO
Orthologs
Databases	NCBI: entry; OMA: entry
Species	Human	Mouse
Entrez	5142	18578
Ensembl	ENSG00000184588	ENSMUSG00000028525
UniProt	Q07343	n/a
RefSeq (mRNA)	NM_001037339; NM_001037340; NM_001037341; NM_001297440; NM_001297441 NM_001297442; NM_002600	NM_001177980; NM_001177981; NM_001177982; NM_001177983; NM_019840 NM_001374780
RefSeq (protein)	NP_001032416; NP_001032417; NP_001032418; NP_001284369; NP_001284370 NP_001284371; NP_002591; NP_001032418.1; NP_002591.2	n/a
Location (UCSC)	Chr 1: 65.79 – 66.37 Mb	Chr 4: 101.94 – 102.46 Mb
PubMed search
- Wikidata
View/Edit Human	View/Edit Mouse

cAMP-specific 3',5'-cyclic phosphodiesterase 4B is an enzyme that in humans is encoded by the PDE4B gene.

This gene is a member of the type IV, cyclic AMP (cAMP)-specific, cyclic nucleotide phosphodiesterase (PDE) family. Cyclic nucleotides are important second messengers that regulate and mediate a number of cellular responses to extracellular signals, such as hormones, light, and neurotransmitters. The cyclic nucleotide phosphodiesterases (PDEs) regulate the cellular concentrations of cyclic nucleotides and thereby play a role in signal transduction. This gene encodes a protein that specifically hydrolyzes cAMP. Alternate transcriptional splice variants, encoding different isoforms, have been characterized.

== Clinical relevance ==
Altered activity of this protein has been associated with schizophrenia and bipolar disorder. PDE4B is believed to be the PDE4 subtype involved in the antipsychotic effects of PDE4 inhibitors such as rolipram. PDE4B is involved in dopamine-associated and stress-related behaviours. It has also recently been found to modulate cognition, as reduction in PDE4B activity improves memory and long-term plasticity in mouse models, possibly supporting further therapeutic applications.

== Inhibitors ==
Crisaborole, a boron-containing drug was approved by the FDA in 2016 for the treatment of atopic dermatitis, and as of 2024 is being commercialized by Pfizer under the name of Eucrisa (chemical name: 4-[(1-hydroxy-1,3-dihydro-2,1-benzoxaborol-5-yl)oxy]benzonitrile) mainly acting on PDE4B.
