= Arofylline =

Names
- IUPAC name 3-(4-Chlorophenyl)-1-propyl-7H-purine-2,6-dione

Identifiers
CAS Number	8028-93-1; 136145-07-8
3D model (JSmol)	Interactive image
ChEMBL	ChEMBL1598450
ChemSpider	145757
KEGG	D02985
PubChem CID	166553
UNII	87L38AY71R
CompTox Dashboard (EPA)	DTXSID30159696
- InChI: InChI=1S/C14H13ClN4O2/c1-2-7-18-13(20)11-12(17-8-16-11)19(14(18)21)10-5-3-9(15)4-6-10/h3-6,8H,2,7H2,1H3,(H,16,17) Key: GVTLDPJNRVMCAL-UHFFFAOYSA-N
- SMILES: CCCN1C(=O)C2=C(N=CN2)N(C1=O)C3=CC=C(C=C3)Cl

Properties
Chemical formula	C_{14}H_{13}ClN_{4}O_{2}
Molar mass	304.73 g/mol
- Except where otherwise noted, data are given for materials in their standard state (at 25 °C [77 °F], 100 kPa). Infobox references

Arofylline (codenamed LAS 31025) is a phosphodiesterase inhibitor.
