= BAY 60-7550 =

Names
- Preferred IUPAC name 2-[(3,4-Dimethoxyphenyl)methyl]-7-[(2R,3R)-2-hydroxy-6-phenylhexan-3-yl]-5-methylimidazo[5,1-f][1,2,4]triazin-4(1H)-one

Identifiers
CAS Number	439083-90-6
3D model (JSmol)	Interactive image
ChemSpider	23258683
PubChem CID	25273570
UNII	ZRN7LZK9TQ
CompTox Dashboard (EPA)	DTXSID50649549
- InChI: InChI=1S/C27H32N4O4/c1-17-25-27(33)29-24(16-20-13-14-22(34-3)23(15-20)35-4)30-31(25)26(28-17)21(18(2)32)12-8-11-19-9-6-5-7-10-19/h5-7,9-10,13-15,18,21,32H,8,11-12,16H2,1-4H3,(H,29,30,33)/t18-,21+/m1/s1 Key: MYTWFJKBZGMYCS-NQIIRXRSSA-N
- SMILES: CC1=C2C(=O)N=C(NN2C(=N1)[C@@H](CCCC3=CC=CC=C3)[C@@H](C)O)CC4=CC(=C(C=C4)OC)OC

Properties
Chemical formula	C_{27}H_{32}N_{4}O_{4}
Molar mass	476.577 g·mol^{−1}
- Except where otherwise noted, data are given for materials in their standard state (at 25 °C [77 °F], 100 kPa). Infobox references

BAY 60-7550 is a type 2 phosphodiesterase inhibitor.
