= Zatolmilast =

Chemical compound

Clinical data
- Other names: BPN-14770

Legal status
- Legal status: Investigational

Identifiers
- IUPAC name: 2-[4-[[2-(3-chlorophenyl)-6-(trifluoromethyl)pyridin-4-yl]methyl]phenyl]acetic acid
- CAS Number: 1606974-33-7
- PubChem CID: 90111638
- IUPHAR/BPS: 10451
- DrugBank: DB14790
- ChemSpider: 75533972
- UNII: G786V328X6
- KEGG: D12173
- ChEMBL: ChEMBL4541964
- PDB ligand: KR7 (PDBe, RCSB PDB)

Chemical and physical data
- Formula: C_{21}H_{15}ClF_{3}NO_{2}
- Molar mass: 405.80 g·mol^{−1}
- 3D model (JSmol): Interactive image
- SMILES: C1=CC(=CC(=C1)Cl)C2=NC(=CC(=C2)CC3=CC=C(C=C3)CC(=O)O)C(F)(F)F
- InChI: InChI=1S/C21H15ClF3NO2/c22-17-3-1-2-16(12-17)18-9-15(10-19(26-18)21(23,24)25)8-13-4-6-14(7-5-13)11-20(27)28/h1-7,9-10,12H,8,11H2,(H,27,28); Key:LTSUMTMGJHPGFX-UHFFFAOYSA-N

Zatolmilast is a investigational new drug that is being evaluated to treat fragile X syndrome. It is a PDE4D allosteric inhibitor.

It works by inhibiting breakdown of cyclic AMP (cAMP), with increased cAMP levels thought to increase neuronal connectivity. It has shown increased caregiver symptoms ratings and cognitive scores in a small clinical trial of 30 adults with fragile X syndrome.
