= Zardaverine =

Names
- IUPAC name 3-[4-(Difluoromethoxy)-3-methoxyphenyl]-1H-pyridazin-6-one

Identifiers
CAS Number	101975-10-4
3D model (JSmol)	Interactive image
ChemSpider	5521
PubChem CID	5723
UNII	TQ358GWH6Y
CompTox Dashboard (EPA)	DTXSID8042559
- InChI: InChI=1S/C12H10F2N2O3/c1-18-10-6-7(2-4-9(10)19-12(13)14)8-3-5-11(17)16-15-8/h2-6,12H,1H3,(H,16,17) Key: HJMQDJPMQIHLPB-UHFFFAOYSA-N
- SMILES: COC1=C(C=CC(=C1)C2=NNC(=O)C=C2)OC(F)F

Properties
Chemical formula	C_{12}H_{10}F_{2}N_{2}O_{3}
Molar mass	268.220 g·mol^{−1}
- Except where otherwise noted, data are given for materials in their standard state (at 25 °C [77 °F], 100 kPa). Infobox references

Zardaverine is a dual-selective PDE3/4 phosphodiesterase inhibitor. Studies in vitro suggest that it may have useful anti-cancer properties.
