= Siguazodan =

Names
- IUPAC name 1-Cyano-2-methyl-3-[4-(4-methyl-6-oxo-4,5-dihydro-1H-pyridazin-3-yl)phenyl]guanidine

Identifiers
CAS Number	115344-47-3
3D model (JSmol)	Interactive image
ChEBI	CHEBI:91791
ChEMBL	ChEMBL1256712
ChemSpider	65101
ECHA InfoCard	100.162.222
EC Number	634-221-4
PubChem CID	72124
UNII	5E4UI00UQJ
CompTox Dashboard (EPA)	DTXSID0045202
- InChI: InChI=1S/C14H16N6O/c1-9-7-12(21)19-20-13(9)10-3-5-11(6-4-10)18-14(16-2)17-8-15/h3-6,9H,7H2,1-2H3,(H,19,21)(H2,16,17,18) Key: NUHPODZZKHQQET-UHFFFAOYSA-N
- SMILES: CC1CC(=O)NN=C1C2=CC=C(C=C2)NC(=NC)NC#N

Properties
Chemical formula	C_{14}H_{16}N_{6}O
Molar mass	284.323 g·mol^{−1}
- Except where otherwise noted, data are given for materials in their standard state (at 25 °C [77 °F], 100 kPa). Infobox references

Siguazodan is a phosphodiesterase inhibitor.
