= Difamilast =

Medication

Clinical data
- Trade names: Moizerto, others
- Other names: OPA-15406
- AHFS/Drugs.com: Monograph
- MedlinePlus: a626032
- License data: US DailyMed: Difamilast
- Routes of administration: Topical
- Drug class: PDE4 inhibitor, dermatologic agent
- ATC code: None

Legal status
- Legal status: US: ℞-only; JP: Rx-only

Identifiers
- IUPAC name: N-({2-[4-(difluoromethoxy)-3-(propan-2-yloxy)phenyl]-1,3-oxazol-4-yl}methyl)-2-ethoxybenzamide
- CAS Number: 937782-05-3
- PubChem CID: 57855696
- IUPHAR/BPS: 9776
- DrugBank: DB14987
- ChemSpider: 59718482
- UNII: T3U32GLJ0F
- KEGG: D11314
- ChEMBL: ChEMBL3989968

Chemical and physical data
- Formula: C_{23}H_{24}F_{2}N_{2}O_{5}
- Molar mass: 446.451 g·mol^{−1}
- 3D model (JSmol): Interactive image
- SMILES: CCOC1=CC=CC=C1C(=O)NCC2=COC(=N2)C3=CC=C(OC(F)F)C(OC(C)C)=C3
- InChI: InChI=1S/C23H24F2N2O5/c1-4-29-18-8-6-5-7-17(18)21(28)26-12-16-13-30-22(27-16)15-9-10-19(32-23(24)25)20(11-15)31-14(2)3/h5-11,13-14,23H,4,12H2,1-3H3,(H,26,28); Key:VFBILHPIHUPBPZ-UHFFFAOYSA-N

Difamilast, sold under the brand name Moizerto among others, is a medication used for the treatment of atopic dermatitis. Difamilast is a non-steroidal topical phosphodiesterase 4 (PDE4) inhibitor. Difamilast was discovered and developed by Otsuka Pharmaceutical.

Difamilast was approved for medical use in Japan in September 2021, and in the United States in February 2026.

== Medical uses ==
Difamilast is indicated for the topical treatment of people with mild to moderate atopic dermatitis.

== Society and culture ==
=== Legal status ===
Difamilast was approved for medical use in Japan in September 2021, and in the United States in February 2026.

=== Names ===
Difamilast is the international nonproprietary name.

Difamilast is sold under the brand names Moizerto (JP) and Adquey (US).
