= Atizoram =

Names
- IUPAC name 5-{3-[(1S,2S,4R)-Bicyclo[2.2.1]hept-2-yloxy]-4-methoxyphenyl}tetrahydro-2(1H)-pyrimidinone
- Other names CP-80633

Identifiers
CAS Number	135637-46-6
3D model (JSmol)	Interactive image
ChEMBL	ChEMBL1229569
ChemSpider	8037426
PubChem CID	9861730
UNII	O84FJB49WI
- InChI: InChI=1S/C18H24N2O3/c1-22-15-5-4-12(14-9-19-18(21)20-10-14)8-17(15)23-16-7-11-2-3-13(16)6-11/h4-5,8,11,13-14,16H,2-3,6-7,9-10H2,1H3,(H2,19,20,21)/t11-,13+,16+/m1/s1 Key: LITNEAPWQHVPOK-FFSVYQOJSA-N
- SMILES: COC1=C(C=C(C=C1)C2CNC(=O)NC2)O[C@H]3C[C@@H]4CC[C@H]3C4

Properties
Chemical formula	C_{18}H_{24}N_{2}O_{3}
Molar mass	316.401 g·mol^{−1}
- Except where otherwise noted, data are given for materials in their standard state (at 25 °C [77 °F], 100 kPa). Infobox references

Atizoram (CP-80633) is a phosphodiesterase 4 inhibitor.
