= Adibendan =

Names
- Preferred IUPAC name 7,7-Dimethyl-2-(pyridin-4-yl)-5,7-dihydroimidazo[4,5-f]indol-6(1H)-one

Identifiers
CAS Number	100510-33-6
3D model (JSmol)	Interactive image
ChEMBL	ChEMBL25931
ChemSpider	59277
PubChem CID	65867
UNII	E87N3L27KX
CompTox Dashboard (EPA)	DTXSID30143358
- InChI: InChI=1S/C16H14N4O/c1-16(2)10-7-12-13(8-11(10)20-15(16)21)19-14(18-12)9-3-5-17-6-4-9/h3-8H,1-2H3,(H,18,19)(H,20,21) Key: TVLQBBHUNDMTEC-UHFFFAOYSA-N; InChI=1/C16H14N4O/c1-16(2)10-7-12-13(8-11(10)20-15(16)21)19-14(18-12)9-3-5-17-6-4-9/h3-8H,1-2H3,(H,18,19)(H,20,21) Key: TVLQBBHUNDMTEC-UHFFFAOYAG
- SMILES: CC1(C2=CC3=C(C=C2NC1=O)NC(=N3)C4=CC=NC=C4)C

Properties
Chemical formula	C_{16}H_{14}N_{4}O
Molar mass	278.315 g·mol^{−1}
- Except where otherwise noted, data are given for materials in their standard state (at 25 °C [77 °F], 100 kPa). Infobox references

Adibendan is an inhibitor of phosphodiesterase 3. It has been tested in dogs for its effects on heart output and dilation of blood vessels.

== Synthesis ==
Synthesis: Patent (Ex 14):

Adibendan synthesis

N-benzyloxindole [7135-32-2] (1) is the starting material. Base facilitated alkylation with 2 molar equivalents of methyl halide (via the enolate stabilized carbanion) gives 1-benzyl-3,3-dimethylindol-2-one, PC11086219. Dissolving metal reduction (sodamide generated in situ) was the reaction medium which was employed to cleave the benzyl protecting group to give 3,3-dimethyloxindole [19155-24-9] (2). Nitration of this can obviously be achieved by the nitronium ion (generated in situ from nitric and sulfuric acids) to give 3,3-dimethyl-5-nitro-oxindole [100511-00-0]. Catalytic hydrogenation over palladium then reduces the nitro group to give 3,3-dimethyl-5-amino-oxindole [31523-05-4] (3). Treatment with acetic anhydride protects amino groups as the acetamide. Treatment with nitric acid is then able to add a nitro group on to the aromatic ring which is probably sterically directed. Treatment with acid hydrolyses the acetamide protecting groups to give 3,3-dimethyl-5-amino-6-nitro-oxindole, PC22162178 (4). Catalytic hydrogenation over platinum oxide reduces the nitro group to give 3,3-dimethyl-5,6-diamino-oxindole [100568-79-4]. The last step of the reaction sequence is a condensation with Isonicotinaldehyde [872-85-5], thus completing the synthesis of adibendan (5), respectively.

== See also ==
- Indolidan
