= Drotaverine =

Chemical compound

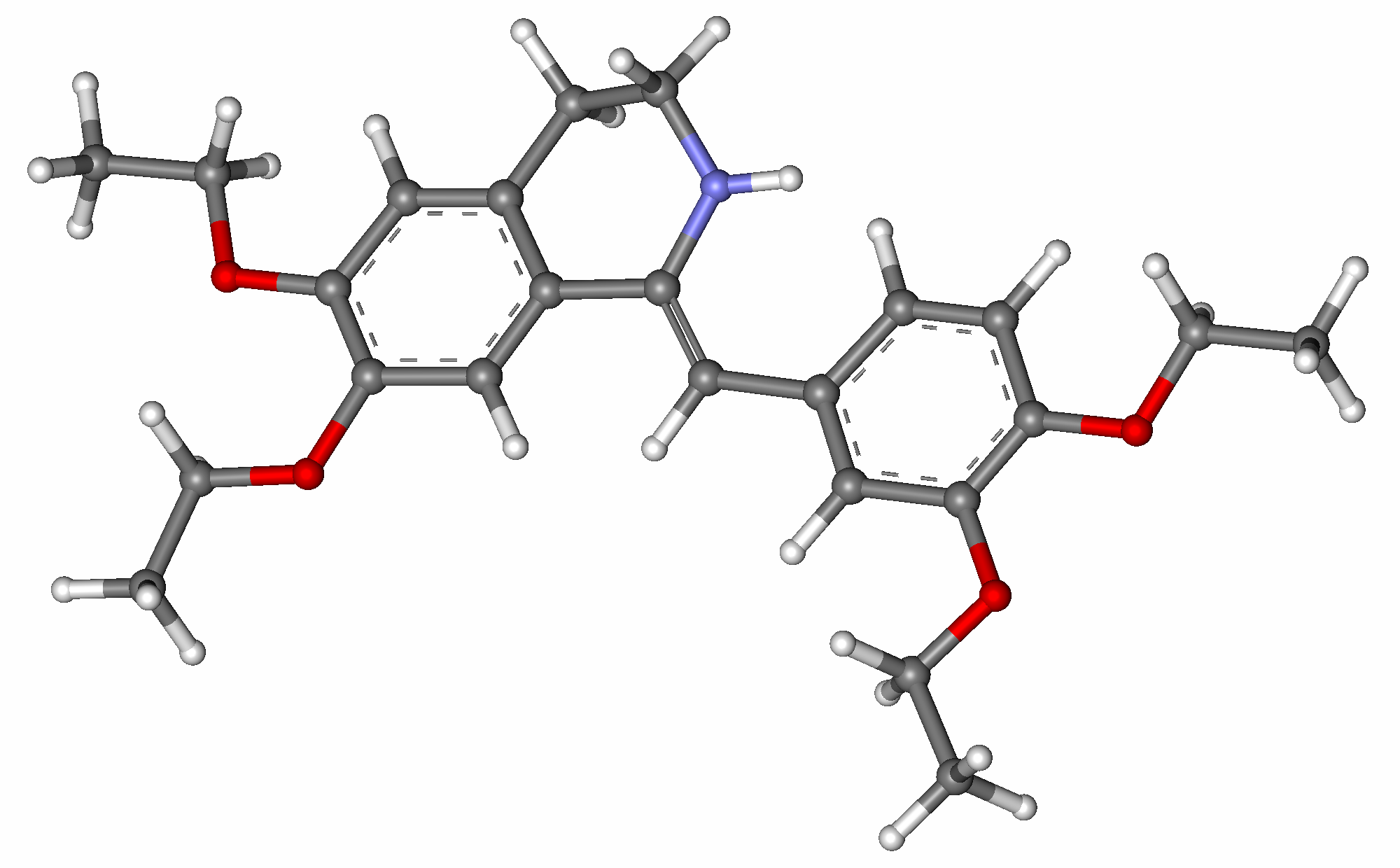

Clinical data
- Trade names: No-Spa, Doverin
- AHFS/Drugs.com: International Drug Names
- Routes of administration: Oral, intravenous, intramuscular
- ATC code: A03AD02 (WHO)

Legal status
- Legal status: OTC (tablets), Rx-only (solution for injection) (RU)

Pharmacokinetic data
- Bioavailability: Highly variable (~65%), peak at 45–60 min
- Protein binding: 95–98%
- Metabolism: Hepatic
- Elimination half-life: 7–16 hours
- Excretion: >50% in urine and ~30% in bile

Identifiers
- IUPAC name: (Z)-1-(3,4-diethoxybenzylidene)-6,7-diethoxy-1,2,3,4-tetrahydroisoquinoline
- CAS Number: 14009-24-6
- PubChem CID: 1712095
- DrugBank: DB06751
- ChemSpider: 1361582
- UNII: 98QS4N58TW
- KEGG: D07879
- ChEMBL: ChEMBL551978
- CompTox Dashboard (EPA): DTXSID60161227
- ECHA InfoCard: 100.110.916

Chemical and physical data
- Formula: C_{24}H_{31}NO_{4}
- Molar mass: 397.515 g·mol^{−1}
- 3D model (JSmol): Interactive image
- SMILES: O(c1ccc(cc1OCC)\C=C3\c2c(cc(OCC)c(OCC)c2)CCN3)CC
- InChI: InChI=1S/C24H31NO4/c1-5-26-21-10-9-17(14-22(21)27-6-2)13-20-19-16-24(29-8-4)23(28-7-3)15-18(19)11-12-25-20/h9-10,13-16,25H,5-8,11-12H2,1-4H3/b20-13-; Key:OMFNSKIUKYOYRG-MOSHPQCFSA-N

Drotaverine (INN, also known as drotaverin) is an antispasmodic drug, used to enhance cervical dilation during childbirth and to relieve smooth muscle spasms in the gastrointestinal tract, urinary system, and gall bladder.

It is structurally related to papaverine, is a phosphodiesterase inhibitor and has no anticholinergic effects.

It is available in Asia, Central and Eastern Europe (Poland, Hungary, Estonia, Latvia, Lithuania, Ukraine ) under several brand names. A popular brand is No-Spa, owned by Sanofi). It is distributed by Sanofi as Но-Шпа (No-shpa) in Russia.

== Pharmacodynamics ==
Drotaverine hydrochloride has a spasmolytic, myotropic, vasodilation, hypotensive action.

Drotaverine decreases active ionized calcium supply binding to smooth muscle cells due to inhibition of phosphodiesterase and intracellular accumulation of cAMP. It has an apparent and prolonged action on smooth muscles of internal organs and blood vessels and it moderately decreases arterial blood pressure, increases cardiac output (minute volume of heart), and has some antiarrhythmic potential.

Drotaverine decreases vascular tone of cerebral blood vessels and increases blood-filling. Practically, Drotaverine does not influence the autonomic nervous system and does not penetrate into the central nervous system.

== Side effects ==
Possible side effects include: heating sensation, dizziness, headache (rarely), insomnia. May be observed: arrhythmia (rarely), hypotension, tachycardia, sweating, nausea.

Overdose of Drotaverine potentially can cause atrioventricular (AV) block, cardiac arrest, paralysis of respiratory system.

== Counterfeits ==
In Israel the product is known under the brand name "No-Spa" by the general public which did not receive a permit to be distributed by the health ministry, however due to high demand local medical counterfeiters have managed to smuggle No-Spa tablets over the years.

In 2008, the Israeli health organization warned consumers against counterfeit No-Spa pills after a smuggler had been arrested at the Ben Gurion Airport with several thousand pills.

In 2011, the Israeli patent and trademark office declined the use of No-SPA.

== Risks ==
An article from 2013 described the effects from overdose (in a 19-year-old female) as including vomiting, seizures and fatal cardiac toxicity.

In 2016, the young Russian chess player Ivan Bukavshin died of a massive overdose (or poisoning) of the drug, which was initially thought to be a stroke; the dose detected in his blood was 17 mg/kg.
