= Furafylline =

Chemical compound

Clinical data
- ATC code: None

Identifiers
- IUPAC name: 3-(Furan-2-ylmethyl)-1,8-dimethyl-7H-purine-2,6-dione
- CAS Number: 80288-49-9
- PubChem CID: 3433
- ChemSpider: 3315
- UNII: C2087G0XX3
- ChEMBL: ChEMBL372638
- CompTox Dashboard (EPA): DTXSID2045153

Chemical and physical data
- Formula: C_{12}H_{12}N_{4}O_{3}
- Molar mass: 260.253 g·mol^{−1}
- 3D model (JSmol): Interactive image
- SMILES: Cc1[nH]c2c(n1)n(c(=O)n(c2=O)C)Cc3ccco3
- InChI: InChI=1S/C12H12N4O3/c1-7-13-9-10(14-7)16(6-8-4-3-5-19-8)12(18)15(2)11(9)17/h3-5H,6H2,1-2H3,(H,13,14); Key:KGQZGCIVHYLPBH-UHFFFAOYSA-N

Furafylline is a methylxanthine derivative that was introduced in hope of being a long-acting replacement for theophylline in the treatment of asthma. It is an inhibitor of CYP1A2.
