= PDE4D =

Protein-coding gene in the species Homo sapiens

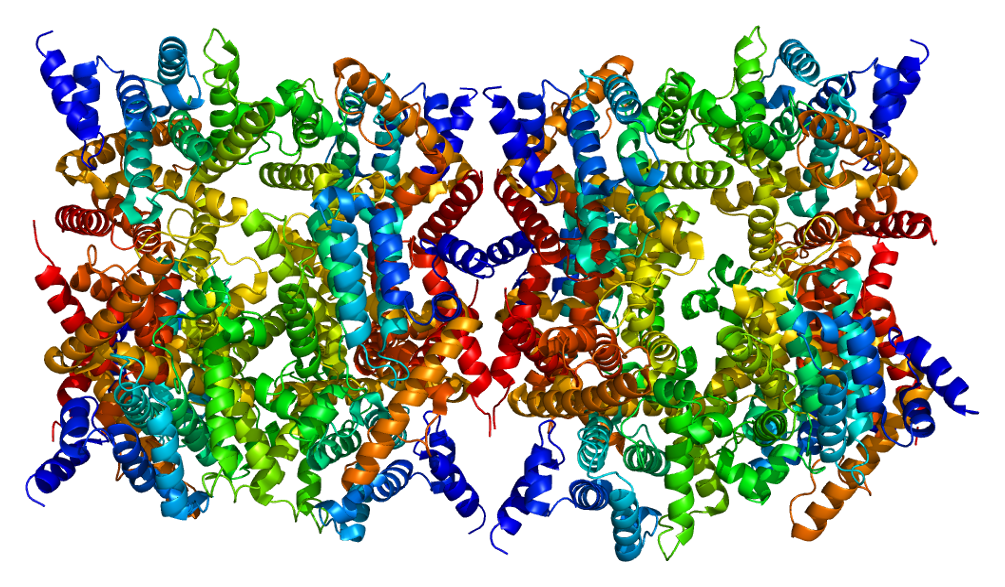
Available structures
PDB	Ortholog search: PDBe RCSB
PDB	List of PDB id codes 1MKD, 1OYN, 1PTW, 1Q9M, 1TB7, 1TBB, 1XOM, 1XON, 1XOQ, 1XOR, 1Y2B, 1Y2C, 1Y2D, 1Y2E, 1Y2K, 1ZKN, 2FM0, 2FM5, 2PW3, 2QYN, 3G4G, 3G4I, 3G4K, 3G4L, 3G58, 3IAD, 3IAK, 3K4S, 3SL3, 3SL4, 3SL5, 3SL6, 3SL8, 3V9B, 4OGB, 4W1O, 4WCU

Identifiers
- Aliases: PDE4D, ACRDYS2, DPDE3, HSPDE43, PDE4DN2, STRK1, phosphodiesterase 4D
- External IDs: OMIM: 600129; MGI: 99555; HomoloGene: 129755; GeneCards: PDE4D; OMA:PDE4D - orthologs

Gene location (Human)
Chr.	Chromosome 5 (human)
Band	5q11.2-q12.1	Start	58,969,038 bp
Band	5q11.2-q12.1	End	60,522,120 bp

Gene location (Mouse)
Chr.	Chromosome 13 (mouse)
Band	13 D2.1|13 59.69 cM	Start	108,586,482 bp
Band	13 D2.1|13 59.69 cM	End	110,089,995 bp
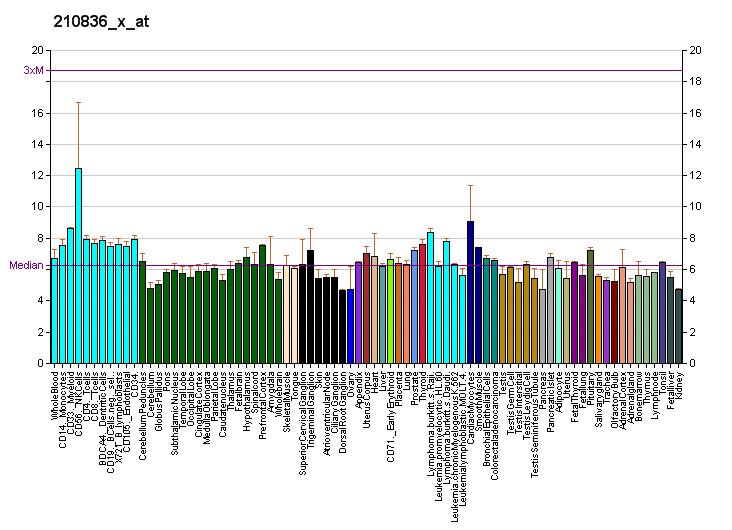

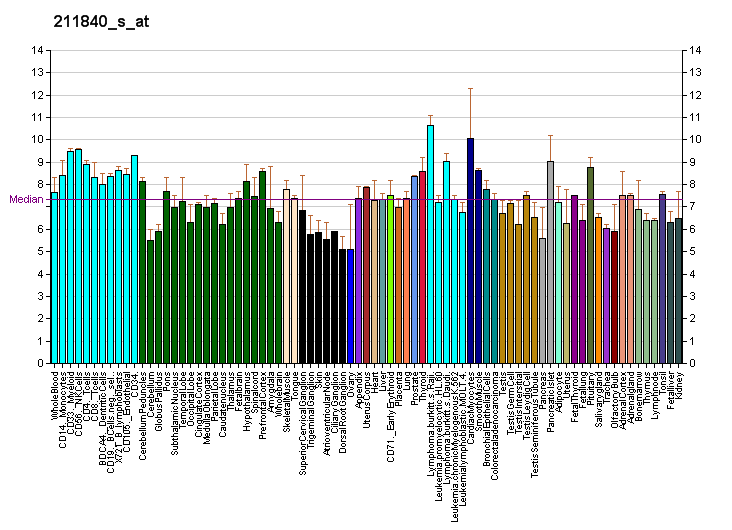

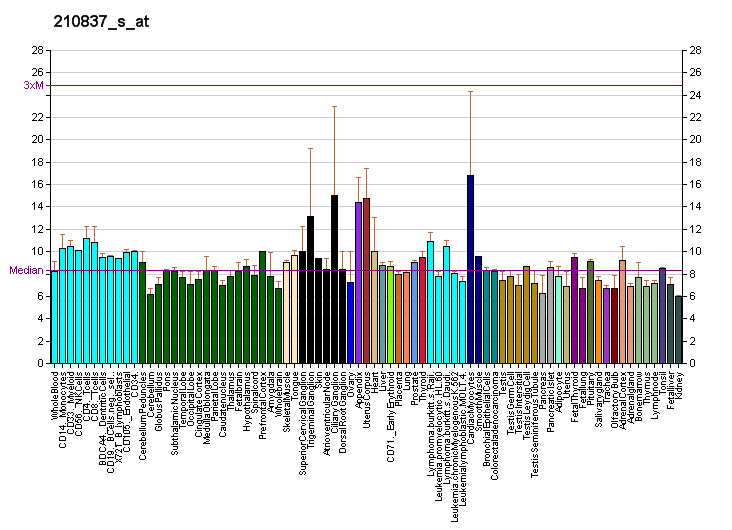
RNA expression pattern
Bgee	Human / Mouse (ortholog); Top expressed in: glutes; muscle of arm; biceps brachii; Skeletal muscle tissue of rectus abdominis; triceps brachii muscle; Skeletal muscle tissue of biceps brachii; thoracic diaphragm; Achilles tendon; gastrocnemius muscle; vastus lateralis muscle / Top expressed in: muscle of thigh; skeletal muscle tissue; quadriceps femoris muscle; olfactory bulb; Cortex of frontal lobe; right kidney; proximal tubule; superior frontal gyrus; primary visual cortex; thymus; More reference expression data
BioGPS	More reference expression data
Gene ontology
Molecular function	ATPase binding; scaffold protein binding; cAMP binding; metal ion binding; beta-2 adrenergic receptor binding; protein binding; phosphoric diester hydrolase activity; enzyme binding; hydrolase activity; ubiquitin protein ligase binding; transmembrane transporter binding; 3',5'-cyclic-AMP phosphodiesterase activity; 3',5'-cyclic-nucleotide phosphodiesterase activity
Cellular component	cytoplasm; cytosol; centrosome; microtubule organizing center; apical plasma membrane; cytoskeleton; membrane; calcium channel complex; voltage-gated calcium channel complex; plasma membrane; nuclear membrane
Biological process	establishment of endothelial barrier; smooth muscle contraction; positive regulation of interleukin-5 production; multicellular organism growth; ageing; regulation of signaling receptor activity; positive regulation of interferon-gamma production; neutrophil chemotaxis; positive regulation of interleukin-2 production; regulation of cell communication by electrical coupling involved in cardiac conduction; adrenergic receptor signaling pathway; cellular response to lipopolysaccharide; T cell receptor signaling pathway; adenylate cyclase-activating adrenergic receptor signaling pathway involved in positive regulation of heart rate; cAMP-mediated signaling; cellular response to cAMP; signal transduction; leukocyte migration; negative regulation of relaxation of cardiac muscle; regulation of release of sequestered calcium ion into cytosol by sarcoplasmic reticulum; negative regulation of heart contraction; regulation of heart rate; regulation of ryanodine-sensitive calcium-release channel activity; cAMP catabolic process; cellular response to epinephrine stimulus; regulation of cardiac muscle cell contraction; negative regulation of peptidyl-serine phosphorylation; G protein-coupled receptor signaling pathway; negative regulation of cAMP-mediated signaling
Sources:Amigo / QuickGO
Orthologs
Species	Human	Mouse
Entrez	5144	238871
Ensembl	ENSG00000113448	ENSMUSG00000021699
UniProt	Q08499	Q01063
RefSeq (mRNA)	NM_001104631; NM_001165899; NM_001197218; NM_001197219; NM_001197220 NM_001197221; NM_001197222; NM_001197223; NM_006203; NM_001349241; NM_001349242; NM_001349243; NM_001364599; NM_001364600; NM_001364601; NM_001364602; NM_001364603; NM_001364604	NM_011056; NM_177252
RefSeq (protein)	NP_001098101; NP_001159371; NP_001184147; NP_001184148; NP_001184149 NP_001184150; NP_001184151; NP_001184152; NP_006194; NP_001336170; NP_001336171; NP_001336172; NP_001351528; NP_001351529; NP_001351530; NP_001351531; NP_001351532; NP_001351533	NP_035186; NP_001389812; NP_001389813; NP_001389814; NP_001389815 NP_001389816; NP_001389817
Location (UCSC)	Chr 5: 58.97 – 60.52 Mb	Chr 13: 108.59 – 110.09 Mb
PubMed search
- Wikidata
View/Edit Human	View/Edit Mouse

cAMP-specific 3',5'-cyclic phosphodiesterase 4D is an enzyme that in humans is encoded by the PDE4D gene.

== Function ==
The PDE4D gene is complex and has at least 9 different isoforms that encode functional proteins. These proteins degrade the second messenger cAMP, which is a key signal transduction molecule in multiple cell types, including vascular cells (Dominiczak and McBride, 2003).[supplied by OMIM]

== Interactions ==
PDE4D has been shown to interact with myomegalin and GNB2L1.

== Clinical relevance ==
Mutations in this gene have been associated to cases of acrodysostosis.

This is the subtype of PDE4 that appears to be involved in the emetic and antidepressant effects of PDE4 inhibitors.

Furthermore, changes in expression of the isoform PDE4D7 have been proposed as prostate cancer biomarker.
