= Crisaborole =

Chemical compound

Clinical data
- Pronunciation: /juːˈkrɪsə/ yoo-KRIS-ə
- Trade names: Eucrisa, Staquis
- Other names: AN-2728
- AHFS/Drugs.com: Monograph
- MedlinePlus: a617019
- License data: US DailyMed: Crisaborole
- Pregnancy category: AU: B1
- Routes of administration: Topical (ointment)
- ATC code: D11AH06 (WHO)

Legal status
- Legal status: CA: ℞-only; US: ℞-only; EU: authorization withdrawn on request of pharmaceutical company; In general: ℞ (Prescription only)

Identifiers
- IUPAC name: 4-[(1-Hydroxy-1,3-dihydro-2,1-benzoxaborol-5-yl)oxy]benzonitrile
- CAS Number: 906673-24-3
- PubChem CID: 44591583
- DrugBank: DB05219
- ChemSpider: 24701949
- UNII: Q2R47HGR7P
- KEGG: D10873
- ChEBI: CHEBI:134677
- ChEMBL: ChEMBL484785
- CompTox Dashboard (EPA): DTXSID10238231
- ECHA InfoCard: 100.225.309

Chemical and physical data
- Formula: C_{14}H_{10}BNO_{3}
- Molar mass: 251.05 g·mol^{−1}
- 3D model (JSmol): Interactive image
- SMILES: B1(c2ccc(cc2CO1)Oc3ccc(cc3)C#N)O
- InChI: InChI=1S/C14H10BNO3/c16-8-10-1-3-12(4-2-10)19-13-5-6-14-11(7-13)9-18-15(14)17/h1-7,17H,9H2; Key:USZAGAREISWJDP-UHFFFAOYSA-N

Crisaborole, sold under the brand name Eucrisa among others, is a nonsteroidal topical medication used for the treatment of mild-to-moderate atopic dermatitis (eczema) in adults and children.

The most common side effects are reactions at the application site (including burning or stinging).

Crisaborole is a phosphodiesterase 4 (PDE-4) inhibitor, although its specific mechanism of action in atopic dermatitis is not known.

== Side effects ==
At the site of application, crisaborole may cause burning or stinging. Rarely, there may be an allergic reaction.

== Medical uses ==
In the US, crisaborole is indicated for topical treatment of mild to moderate atopic dermatitis in people three months of age and older.

In the EU, crisaborole was authorized for treatment of mild to moderate atopic dermatitis in people two years of age and older with ≤ 40% body surface area (BSA) affected.

== Pharmacology ==
=== Pharmacodynamics ===
Crisaborole is a phosphodiesterase-4 inhibitor, mainly acting on phosphodiesterase 4B (PDE4B), which causes inflammation. Chemically, crisaborole is a phenoxybenzoxaborole. Inhibition of PDE4B appears to suppress the release of tumor necrosis factor alpha (TNFα), interleukin-12 (IL-12), IL-23 and other cytokines, proteins believed to be involved in the immune response and inflammation.

People with atopic dermatitis produce high levels of cytokines, which can cause the inflammation of the skin seen in dermatitis. Crisaborole blocks the release of certain cytokines involved in the inflammation process such as tumor necrosis factor alpha, interleukins (IL‑2, IL-4, IL-5), and interferon gamma. By blocking their release, crisaborole is expected to ease the inflammation and therefore relieve symptoms of the disease.

== Chemistry ==
Crisaborole (chemical name: 4-[(1-hydroxy-1,3-dihydro-2,1-benzoxaborol-5-yl)oxy]benzonitrile) is a member of the class of benzoxaboroles characterized by the presence of a boronic acid hemiester with a phenolic ether and a nitrile. Crisaborole crystallizes into two polymorphs that differ in the conformation of the oxaborole ring. A cocrystal with 4,4'-bipyridine has been prepared and studied by X-ray crystallography.

== History ==
Crisaborole was developed by Anacor Pharmaceuticals for the topical treatment of psoriasis. During preclinical and clinical development, crisaborole was called AN2728 and PF-06930164. The drug was assumed to be potential $2bn-a-year blockbuster, when Pfizer acquired Anacor Pharmaceuticals. However, the drug was commercially not successful, reaching only US$147 million in sales in 2018, and US$138 million in sales in 2019.

Crisaborole was approved for use in the United States in December 2016 and for use in Canada in June 2018.

The safety and efficacy of crisaborole were established in two placebo-controlled trials with a total of 1,522 participants ranging in age from two years of age to 79 years of age, with mild to moderate atopic dermatitis. In both trials participants received treatment with either crisaborole or placebo twice daily for 28 days. Neither the participants nor the health care providers knew which treatment was being given until after the trials were completed. Overall, participants receiving crisaborole achieved greater response with clear or almost clear skin after 28 days of treatment. The trials were conducted in the US.

Crisaborole, approved for the treatment of mild to moderate atopic dermatitis in the European Union, has been rapidly withdrawn from the European market (March 2020 - February 2022).

== See also ==
- Tavaborole – a structurally related topical antifungal developed by Anacor
