= PDE4C =

Protein-coding gene in the species Homo sapiens

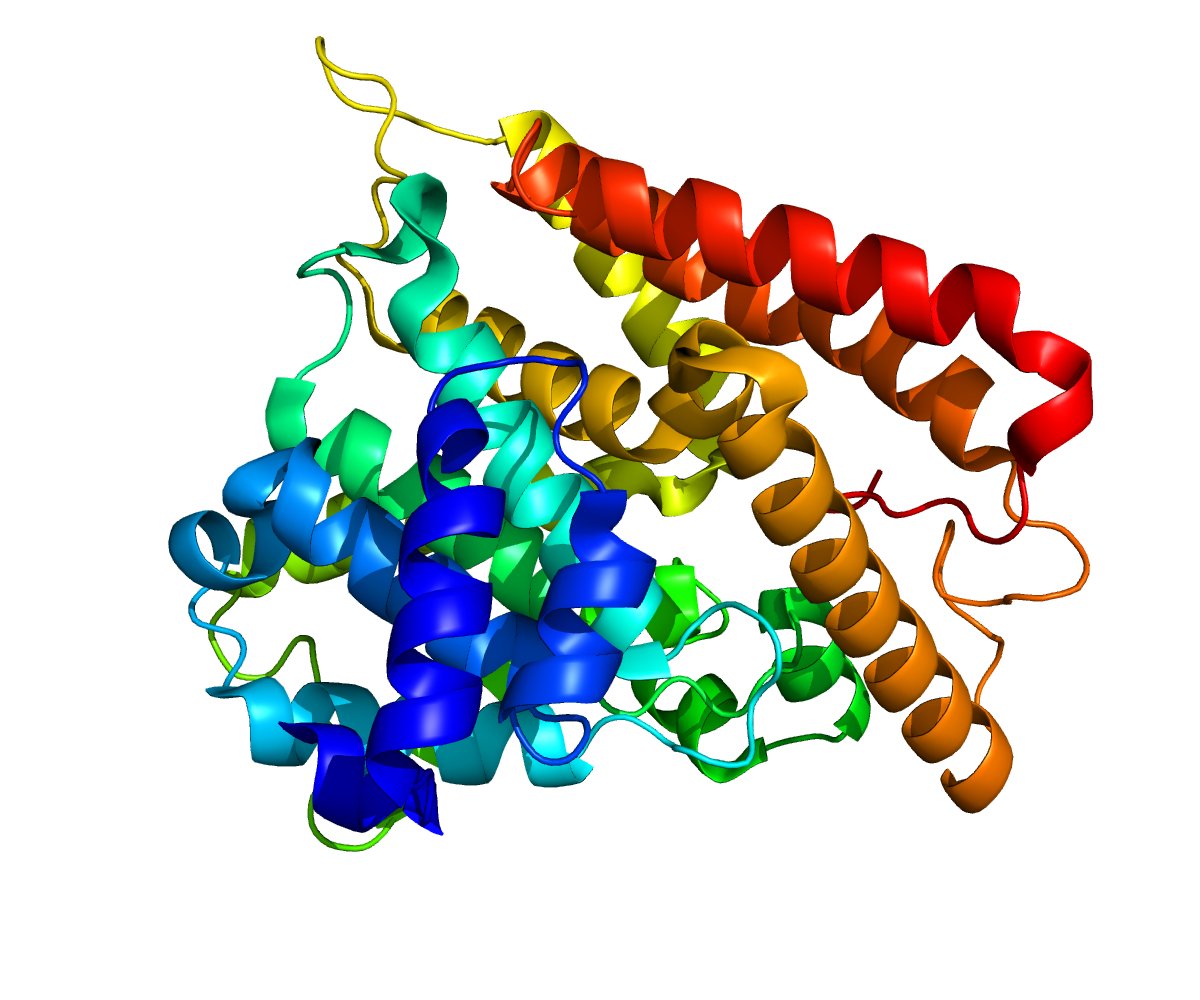
Available structures
PDB	Ortholog search: PDBe RCSB
PDB	List of PDB id codes 2QYM

Identifiers
- Aliases: PDE4C, DPDE1, phosphodiesterase 4C, PDE21
- External IDs: OMIM: 600128; MGI: 99556; HomoloGene: 20256; GeneCards: PDE4C; OMA:PDE4C - orthologs

Gene location (Human)
Chr.	Chromosome 19 (human)
Band	19p13.11	Start	18,208,652 bp
Band	19p13.11	End	18,248,200 bp

Gene location (Mouse)
Chr.	Chromosome 8 (mouse)
Band	8 B3.3|8 34.15 cM	Start	71,176,369 bp
Band	8 B3.3|8 34.15 cM	End	71,203,835 bp
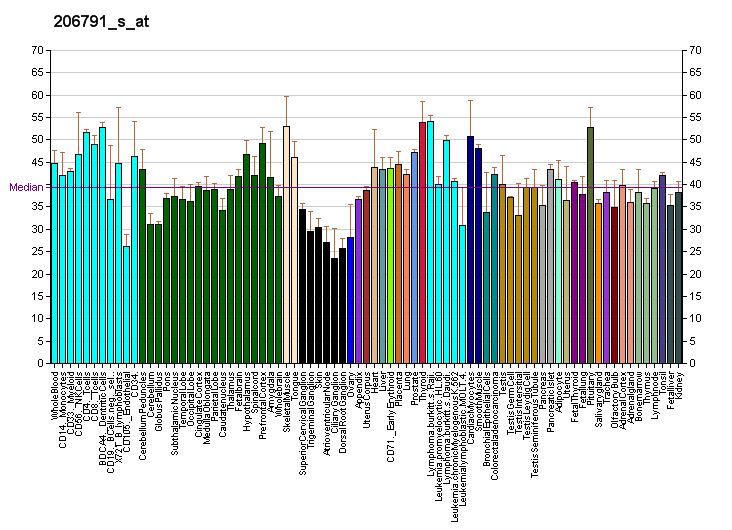

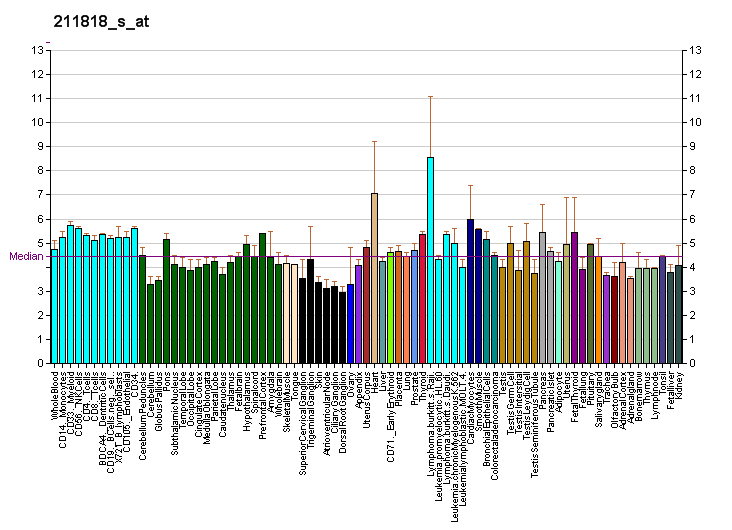

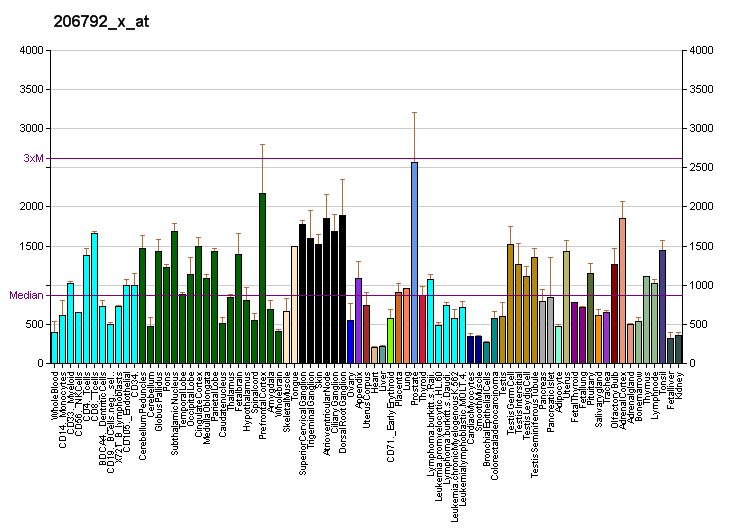
RNA expression pattern
Bgee	Human / Mouse (ortholog); Top expressed in: apex of heart; muscle of thigh; tibial arteries; spleen; skeletal muscle tissue; gastrocnemius muscle; left ventricle; testicle; muscle layer of sigmoid colon; stromal cell of endometrium / Top expressed in: renal cortex; proximal tubule; human kidney; right kidney; islet of Langerhans; hepatobiliary system; liver; muscle of thigh; muscle tissue; duodenum; More reference expression data
BioGPS	More reference expression data
Gene ontology
Molecular function	phosphoric diester hydrolase activity; protein binding; 3',5'-cyclic-nucleotide phosphodiesterase activity; hydrolase activity; metal ion binding; 3',5'-cyclic-AMP phosphodiesterase activity
Cellular component	cytosol; cell projection; extracellular space; cilium
Biological process	cAMP catabolic process; signal transduction; G protein-coupled receptor signaling pathway
Sources:Amigo / QuickGO
Orthologs
Species	Human	Mouse
Entrez	5143	110385
Ensembl	ENSG00000105650	ENSMUSG00000031842
UniProt	Q08493	Q3UEI1
RefSeq (mRNA)	NM_000923; NM_001098818; NM_001098819; NM_001330172; NM_001369701 NM_001395274	NM_201607; NM_001310465
RefSeq (protein)	NP_000914; NP_001092288; NP_001092289; NP_001317101; NP_001356630	NP_001297394; NP_963901
Location (UCSC)	Chr 19: 18.21 – 18.25 Mb	Chr 8: 71.18 – 71.2 Mb
PubMed search
- Wikidata
View/Edit Human	View/Edit Mouse

cAMP-specific 3',5'-cyclic phosphodiesterase 4C is an enzyme that in humans is encoded by the PDE4C gene.

== Tissue localisation ==
PDE4C is predominantly found in peripheral tissues.
