= Phosphodiesterase 4 =

At least four types of the enzyme phosphodiesterase 4 (PDE4) are known:

- PDE4A
- PDE4B
- PDE4C
- PDE4D

== See also ==
- 3',5'-cyclic-AMP phosphodiesterase
- Phosphodiesterase (PDE)
- PDE4 inhibitor
