= Cilomilast =

Chemical compound

Clinical data
- Routes of administration: By mouth (tablets)
- ATC code: None

Legal status
- Legal status: US: Not approved

Identifiers
- IUPAC name: cis-4-cyano-4-[3-(cyclopentyloxy)-4-methoxyphenyl]cyclohexanecarboxylic acid
- CAS Number: 153259-65-5
- PubChem CID: 151170
- IUPHAR/BPS: 7407
- ChemSpider: 18826005
- UNII: 8ATB1C1R6X
- ChEMBL: ChEMBL511115
- CompTox Dashboard (EPA): DTXSID6046686

Chemical and physical data
- Formula: C_{20}H_{25}NO_{4}
- Molar mass: 343.423 g·mol^{−1}
- 3D model (JSmol): Interactive image
- SMILES: COC1=C(C=C(C=C1)C2(CCC(CC2)C(=O)O)C#N)OC3CCCC3
- InChI: InChI=1S/C20H25NO4/c1-24-17-7-6-15(12-18(17)25-16-4-2-3-5-16)20(13-21)10-8-14(9-11-20)19(22)23/h6-7,12,14,16H,2-5,8-11H2,1H3,(H,22,23)/t14-,20-; Key:CFBUZOUXXHZCFB-OYOVHJISSA-N

Cilomilast (INN, development code SB-207,499, proposed trade name Ariflo) is a drug which was developed for the treatment of respiratory disorders such as asthma and chronic obstructive pulmonary disease (COPD). It is orally active and acts as a selective phosphodiesterase-4 inhibitor.

Phosphodiesterase (PDE) inhibitors, such as theophylline, have been used to treat COPD for centuries; however, the clinical benefits of these agents have never been shown to outweigh the risks of their numerous adverse effects. Four clinical trials were identified evaluating the efficacy of cilomilast, the usual randomized, double-blind, and placebo-controlled protocols were used. It showed reasonable efficacy for treating COPD, but side effects were problematic and it is unclear whether cilomilast will be marketed, or merely used in the development of newer drugs.

Cilomilast is a second-generation PDE4 inhibitor with anti-inflammatory effects that target bronchoconstriction, mucus hypersecretion, and airway remodeling associated with COPD.

== History ==
GlaxoSmithKline (GSK) filed for drug approval with the U.S. FDA at the end of 2002 and in January 2003 with the European Medicines Evaluation Agency (EMEA). In October 2003, the FDA issued an approvable letter for use of cilomilast in maintenance of lung function in COPD patients poorly responsive to salbutamol, despite an earlier decision by the FDA advisory panel to reject approval. The rejection was based on concerns over the efficacy of the agent, as well as gastrointestinal side effects. Before issuing final approval, however, the FDA requested additional efficacy and safety data. The development of the drug was finally abandoned by GSK.

== Synthesis ==
Methods for the synthesis of cilomilast have been reported.

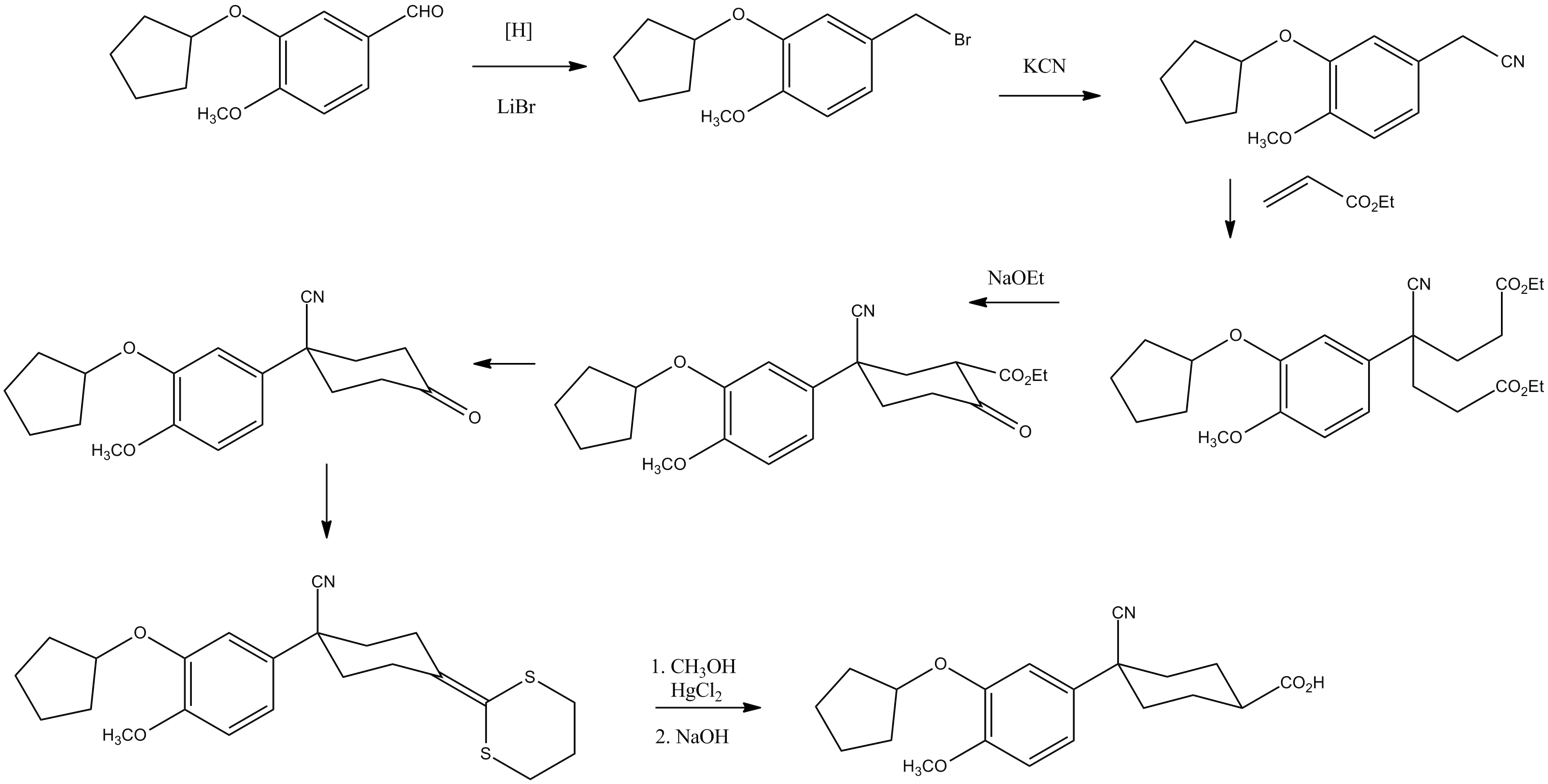
