= Rolipram =

Chemical compound

Clinical data
- ATC code: none

Legal status
- Legal status: Investigational

Pharmacokinetic data
- Bioavailability: 75%
- Metabolism: Liver via CYP2C8, CYP2C9, CYP2C19 and CYP2D6
- Elimination half-life: 3 hours
- Excretion: Urine (80%)

Identifiers
- IUPAC name: (RS)-4-(3-cyclopentyloxy-4-methoxy-phenyl)pyrrolidin-2-one
- CAS Number: 61413-54-5
- PubChem CID: 5092
- IUPHAR/BPS: 5260
- DrugBank: DB04149
- ChemSpider: 4913
- UNII: K676NL63N7
- KEGG: D01783
- ChEBI: CHEBI:104872
- ChEMBL: ChEMBL63
- CompTox Dashboard (EPA): DTXSID3044124
- ECHA InfoCard: 100.057.046

Chemical and physical data
- Formula: C_{16}H_{21}NO_{3}
- Molar mass: 275.348 g·mol^{−1}
- 3D model (JSmol): Interactive image
- SMILES: COc1ccc(cc1OC1CCCC1)C1CNC(=O)C1
- InChI: InChI=1S/C16H21NO3/c1-19-14-7-6-11(12-9-16(18)17-10-12)8-15(14)20-13-4-2-3-5-13/h6-8,12-13H,2-5,9-10H2,1H3,(H,17,18); Key:HJORMJIFDVBMOB-UHFFFAOYSA-N

Rolipram is a selective phosphodiesterase-4 inhibitor discovered and developed by Schering AG as a potential antidepressant drug in the early 1990s. It served as a prototype molecule for several companies' drug discovery and development efforts. Rolipram was discontinued after clinical trials showed that its therapeutic window was too narrow; it could not be dosed at high enough levels to be effective without causing significant gastrointestinal side effects.

Rolipram has several activities that make it a continuing focus for research. The etiology of many neurodegenerative diseases involves misfolded and clumped proteins which accumulate in the brain. Cells have a mechanism to dispose of such proteins called the proteasome. However, in Alzheimer's disease and some other conditions the activity of these proteasomes is impaired leading to a buildup of toxic aggregates. Research in mice suggests that rolipram has the ability to ramp up the activity of proteasomes and reduce the burden of these aggregates. Preliminary evidence suggests that this can improve spatial memory in mice engineered to have aggregate build-up. Rolipram continues to be used in research as a well-characterized PDE4 inhibitor. It has been used in studies to understand whether PDE4 inhibition could be useful in autoimmune diseases, Alzheimer's disease, cognitive enhancement, spinal cord injury, and respiratory diseases like asthma and COPD.

== See also ==
- Roflumilast
