= Phosphodiesterase inhibitor =

Drug

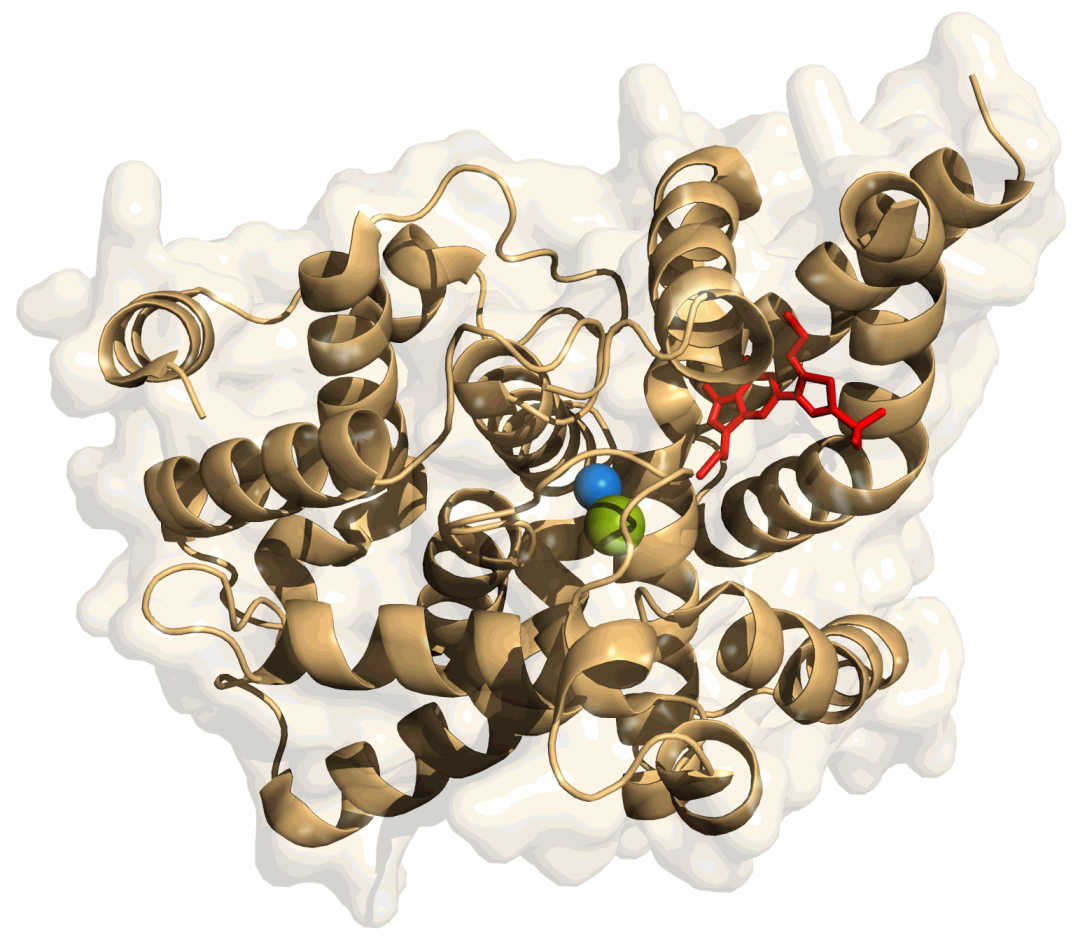
Phosphodiesterase-5

A phosphodiesterase inhibitor is a drug that blocks one or more of the five subtypes of the enzyme phosphodiesterase (PDE), thereby preventing the inactivation of the intracellular second messengers, cyclic adenosine monophosphate (cAMP) and cyclic guanosine monophosphate (cGMP) by the respective PDE subtype(s). The ubiquitous presence of this enzyme means that non-specific inhibitors have a wide range of actions, with those in the heart and lungs being some of the first to find therapeutic use.

== History ==
The different forms or subtypes of phosphodiesterase were initially isolated from rat brains in the early 1970s and were soon afterward shown to be selectively inhibited in the brain and in other tissues by a variety of drugs. The potential for selective phosphodiesterase inhibitors as therapeutic agents was predicted as early as 1977 by Weiss and Hait. This prediction meanwhile has proved to be true in a variety of fields.

== Classification ==
=== Nonselective ===
Methylated xanthines and derivatives:

- caffeine, a minor stimulant
- aminophylline
- IBMX (3-isobutyl-1-methylxanthine), used as investigative tool in pharmacological research
- paraxanthine
- pentoxifylline, a drug that has the potential to enhance circulation and may have applicability in treatment of diabetes, fibrotic disorders, peripheral nerve damage, and microvascular injuries
- theobromine
- theophylline, a bronchodilator

Methylated xanthines act as both

1. competitive nonselective phosphodiesterase inhibitors, which raise intracellular cAMP, activate PKA, inhibit TNF-alpha and leukotriene synthesis, and reduce inflammation and innate immunity and
2. nonselective adenosine receptor antagonists

But different analogues show varying potency at the numerous subtypes, and a wide range of synthetic xanthine derivatives (some nonmethylated) have been developed in the search for compounds with greater selectivity for phosphodiesterase enzyme or adenosine receptor subtypes.

=== Selective ===
==== PDE2 ====
- EHNA (erythro-9-(2-hydroxy-3-nonyl)adenine)
- BAY 60-7550 (2-[(3,4-dimethoxyphenyl)methyl]-7-[(1R)-1-hydroxyethyl]-4-phenylbutyl]-5-methyl-imidazo[5,1-f][1,2,4]triazin-4(1H)-one)
- Oxindole
- PDP (9-(6-Phenyl-2-oxohex-3-yl)-2-(3,4-dimethoxybenzyl)-purin-6-one)

==== PDE3 ====
- Amrinone, milrinone and enoximone are used clinically for short-term treatment of cardiac failure. These drugs mimic sympathetic stimulation and increase cardiac output.
- Anagrelide
- Cilostazol is used in the treatment of intermittent claudication.
- Pimobendan is FDA approved for veterinary use in the treatment of heart failure in animals.

PDE3 is sometimes referred to as cGMP-inhibited phosphodiesterase.

==== PDE4 ====
PDE4 inhibitors

- Mesembrenone, an alkaloid from the herb Sceletium tortuosum
- Rolipram, used as investigative tool in pharmacological research
- Ibudilast, a neuroprotective and bronchodilator drug used mainly in the treatment of asthma and stroke. It inhibits PDE4 to the greatest extent, but also shows significant inhibition of other PDE subtypes, and so acts as a selective PDE4 inhibitor or a non-selective phosphodiesterase inhibitor, depending on the dose.
- Piclamilast, a more potent inhibitor than rolipram.
- Luteolin, supplement extracted from peanuts that also possesses IGF-1 properties.
- Drotaverine, used to alleviate renal colic pain, also to hasten cervical dilatation in labor
- Roflumilast, indicated for people with severe COPD to prevent symptoms such as coughing and excess mucus from worsening
- Apremilast, used to treat psoriasis and psoriatic arthritis.
- Crisaborole, used to treat atopic dermatitis.
- Glaucine, an aporphine alkaloid, low-potency PDE4 inhibitor, calcium channel blocker, dopamine antagonist and 5-HT2A positive allosteric modulator, used as antitussive in Eastern Europe and Iceland.

PDE4 is the major cAMP-metabolizing enzyme found in inflammatory and immune cells. PDE4 inhibitors have proven potential as anti-inflammatory drugs, especially in inflammatory pulmonary diseases such as asthma, COPD, and rhinitis. They suppress the release of cytokines and other inflammatory signals, and inhibit the production of reactive oxygen species. PDE4 inhibitors may have antidepressive effects and have also been proposed for use as antipsychotics.

On October 26, 2009, the University of Pennsylvania reported that researchers at their institution had discovered a link between elevated levels of PDE4 (and therefore decreased levels of cAMP) in sleep deprived mice. Treatment with a PDE4 inhibitor raised the deficient cAMP levels and restored some functionality to hippocampus-based memory functions.

==== PDE5 ====
- Sildenafil, tadalafil, vardenafil, and the newer udenafil and avanafil selectively inhibit PDE5, which is cGMP-specific and responsible for the degradation of cGMP in the corpus cavernosum. These phosphodiesterase inhibitors are used primarily as remedies for erectile dysfunction, as well as having some other medical applications such as treatment of pulmonary hypertension.
- Dipyridamole also inhibits PDE5. This results in added benefit when given together with nitric oxide or statins.

==== PDE7 ====
Recent studies have shown quinazoline type PDE7 inhibitor to be potent anti-inflammatory and neuroprotective agents.

==== PDE9 ====
Paraxanthine, the main metabolite of caffeine (84% in humans), is another cGMP-specific phosphodiesterase inhibitor which inhibits PDE9, a cGMP preferring phosphodiesterase. PDE9 is expressed as high as PDE5 in the corpus cavernosum.

==== PDE10 ====
Papaverine, an opium alkaloid, has been reported to act as a PDE10 inhibitor. PDE10A is almost exclusively expressed in the striatum and subsequent increase in cAMP and cGMP after PDE10A inhibition (e.g. by papaverine) is "a novel therapeutic avenue in the discovery of antipsychotics".
