= Roflumilast =

Medication

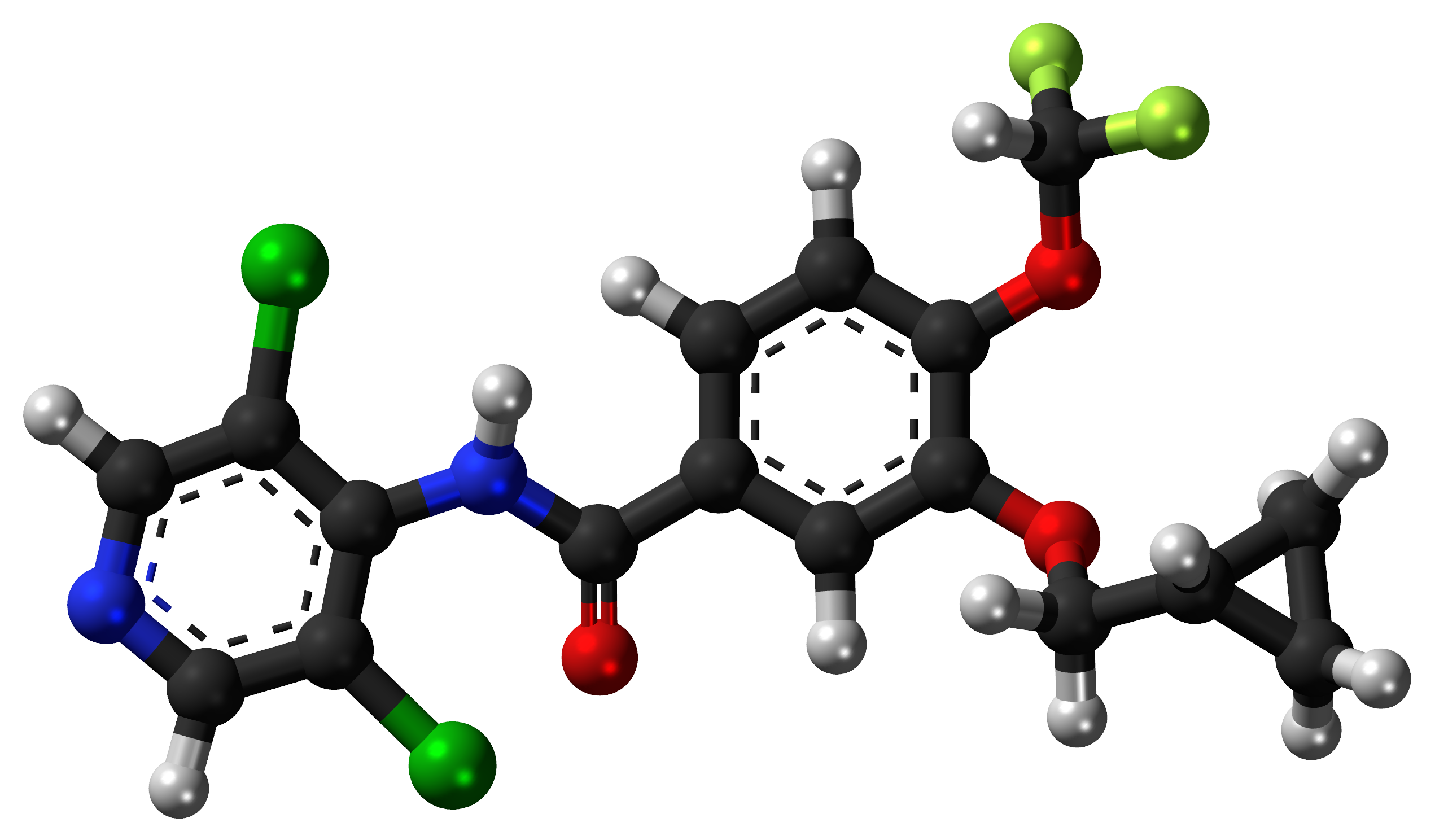

Clinical data
- Trade names: Daxas, Daliresp, Zoryve, others
- AHFS/Drugs.com: Monograph
- MedlinePlus: a611034
- License data: US DailyMed: Roflumilast
- Pregnancy category: AU: B3
- Routes of administration: By mouth, topical
- Drug class: PDE4 inhibitor
- ATC code: R03DX07 (WHO) D05AX06 (WHO)

Legal status
- Legal status: AU: S4 (Prescription only); CA: ℞-only; UK: POM (Prescription only); US: ℞-only; EU: Rx-only

Pharmacokinetic data
- Bioavailability: 79%
- Protein binding: 99%
- Metabolism: Hepatic via CYP1A2 & CYP3A4
- Elimination half-life: 17 hours (30 hours [active metabolite])
- Excretion: Urine (70%)

Identifiers
- IUPAC name: 3-(Cyclopropylmethoxy)-N-(3,5-dichloropyridin-4-yl)-4-(difluoromethoxy)benzamide
- CAS Number: 162401-32-3
- PubChem CID: 449193
- IUPHAR/BPS: 6962
- DrugBank: DB01656
- ChemSpider: 395793
- UNII: 0P6C6ZOP5U
- KEGG: D05744
- ChEBI: CHEBI:47657
- ChEMBL: ChEMBL193240
- PDB ligand: ROF (PDBe, RCSB PDB)
- CompTox Dashboard (EPA): DTXSID8044123
- ECHA InfoCard: 100.210.960

Chemical and physical data
- Formula: C_{17}H_{14}Cl_{2}F_{2}N_{2}O_{3}
- Molar mass: 403.21 g·mol^{−1}
- 3D model (JSmol): Interactive image
- SMILES: C1CC1COC2=C(C=CC(=C2)C(=O)NC3=C(C=NC=C3Cl)Cl)OC(F)F
- InChI: InChI=1S/C17H14Cl2F2N2O3/c18-11-6-22-7-12(19)15(11)23-16(24)10-3-4-13(26-17(20)21)14(5-10)25-8-9-1-2-9/h3-7,9,17H,1-2,8H2,(H,22,23,24); Key:MNDBXUUTURYVHR-UHFFFAOYSA-N

Roflumilast, sold under the brand name Daxas among others, is a medication used for the treatment of chronic obstructive pulmonary disease, plaque psoriasis, seborrheic dermatitis, and atopic dermatitis. It acts as a selective, long-acting inhibitor of the enzyme phosphodiesterase-4 (PDE-4). It has anti-inflammatory effects.

It was approved for medical use in the European Union in 2010, in the United States in 2011, and in Canada in 2017. It is available as a generic medication.

== Medical uses ==
Roflumilast is indicated for the treatment of severe chronic obstructive pulmonary disease (COPD), plaque psoriasis, seborrheic dermatitis, and atopic dermatitis,

It is used in the prevention of exacerbations (lung attacks) in severe chronic obstructive pulmonary disease (COPD).

== Adverse effects ==
Common (1–10% incidence) adverse effects include diarrhea, weight loss, nausea, headache, insomnia, decreased appetite, abdominal pain, rhinitis, sinusitis, urinary tract infection, and depression.

== Society and culture ==
=== Legal status ===
In June 2010, an oral formulation of roflumilast was approved in the European Union for severe COPD associated with chronic bronchitis. In February 2011, it gained FDA approval in the United States for reducing COPD exacerbations.

In July 2022, the FDA approved roflumilast cream 0.3% (Zoryve) for the treatment of plaque psoriasis in patients 12 years of age and older. In December 2023, the agency approved a 0.3% topical foam formulation for seborrheic dermatitis in patients aged nine and older, marking the first new mechanism of action for the condition in over two decades. In July 2024, the FDA approved a 0.15% cream formulation as a once-daily treatment for mild to moderate atopic dermatitis in adults and children aged six and older. In May 2025, the 0.3% foam formulation received further approval for plaque psoriasis in adults and adolescents aged 12 and older. Subsequently, in October 2025, the FDA extended approval of a 0.05% cream formulation to include pediatric patients aged two to five with atopic dermatitis.
