= Conditioned avoidance response test =

Test of antipsychotic-like activity

The conditioned avoidance response (CAR) test, also known as the active avoidance test, is an animal test used to identify drugs with antipsychotic-like effects by checking if they limit the animals' will. It is most commonly employed as a two-way active avoidance test with rodents. The test assesses the conditioned ability of an animal to avoid an unpleasant stimulus. Drugs that selectively suppress conditioned avoidance responses without affecting escape behavior are considered to have antipsychotic-like activity. Variations of the test, like testing for enhancement of avoidance and escape responses, have also been used to assess other drug effects, like pro-motivational and antidepressant-like effects.

Dopamine D_{2} receptor antagonists, like most classical antipsychotics, are active in the CAR test once occupancy of the dopamine D_{2} receptor reaches around 70%. Dopamine D_{2} receptor partial agonists like aripiprazole are likewise active in the test. Serotonin 5-HT_{2A} receptor antagonists can enhance suppression of conditioned avoidance responses in the test. Various other types of drugs have also been found to be active in the CAR test. The effects of drugs that are active in the test are thought to be mediated by inhibition of signaling in the nucleus accumbens or ventral striatum of the mesolimbic pathway. This is a major brain area involved in behavioral activation and motivation.

The CAR test was developed in the 1950s soon after the discovery of antipsychotics. It is one of the oldest animal tests of antipsychotic-like activity. Other animal tests that are used to evaluate antipsychotic-like activity include inhibition of drug-induced hyperactivity or stereotypy, reversal of drug-induced prepulse inhibition deficits, and restoration of latent inhibition.

== Description ==
There are several variations of the CAR test. The most common form of the test is the two-way active avoidance test (also known as the two-way discriminated shuttle box procedure). Other variations of the test include the one-way active avoidance test (also known as the one-way discriminated pole jump procedure or the pole-jumping test) and the non-discriminated operant continuous avoidance procedure (also known as the continuous avoidance test, the Sidman avoidance test, or simply the Sidman procedure).

In the two-way active avoidance test, an animal is placed in a two-compartment shuttle box with an open doorway. Then, the animal is trained to avoid an aversive stimulus (unconditioned stimulus), usually an electric footshock, on presentation of a neutral stimulus (conditioned stimulus), usually an auditory or visual stimulus like a tone or light, that shortly precedes it. The animal does this by performing a specific behavioral response, like moving to the other compartment of the box, and this response is referred to as "avoidance" or "conditioned avoidance". If the animal is late in performing the avoidance, the aversive stimulus is presented until the animal responds by moving to the compartment. This is referred to as "escape". If the animal does not escape within a certain amount of time, it is designated "escape failure". As such, there are three variables that can be measured in the CAR test: avoidance, escape, and escape failure.

Drugs that are considered to show antipsychotic-like effects selectively suppress the avoidance response without affecting escape behavior. Conversely, drugs that are not considered to have antipsychotic-like effects either have no effect in the CAR test or suppress both avoidance behavior and escape behavior at the same doses. Examples of drugs that inhibit both avoidance and escape responses include sedatives like benzodiazepines, barbiturates, and meprobamate and antidepressants like many tricyclic antidepressants (TCAs).

The CAR test is considered to have high predictive validity in the identification of potential antipsychotics and is frequently used in drug development. However, its face validity and construct validity have been described as low or absent. Moreover, a described major limitation of the model is that drugs active in the test work by impairing a normal self-preservation function; that is, avoiding an unpleasant or painful stimulus.

Another limitation of the CAR test is that selective suppression of avoidance responses by drugs is procedure-specific. In procedures besides the one-way discriminated pole jump procedure and the two-way active avoidance test, such as the Sidman procedure, antipsychotics block avoidance behavior and escapes at almost the same doses. Conversely, benzodiazepines selectively suppress avoidance behavior without affecting escape behavior in the Sidman procedure. This is opposite to what is generally described as reflecting antipsychotic-like activity. Hence, selective suppression of avoidance responses is not a specific predictor of antipsychotic efficacy, or at best, selective suppression of avoidance responses as a predictor of antipsychotic activity is dependent on the specific CAR procedure employed.

== Drugs affecting the test ==
=== Active drugs ===
The test can detect antipsychotic-like activity both in the case of dopamine D_{2} receptor antagonists and in the case of drugs lacking D_{2} receptor antagonism. The occupancy of the D_{2} receptor by antagonists of this receptor required to inhibit the CAR is around 65 to 80%, which is similar to the occupancy at which therapeutic antipsychotic effects occur in humans with these drugs. Both typical antipsychotics and atypical antipsychotics are active in the CAR test. Similarly to dopamine D_{2} receptor antagonists, dopamine depleting agents like reserpine and tetrabenazine suppress conditioned avoidance responses and hence are active in the CAR test.

Selective serotonin 5-HT_{2A} receptor antagonists like volinanserin (MDL-100907) and ritanserin can enhance the suppression of conditioned avoidance responses by dopamine D_{2} receptor antagonists. Serotonin 5-HT_{1A} receptor agonism, for instance with buspirone, 8-OH-DPAT, or antipsychotics with concomitant 5-HT_{1A} receptor agonism, may also enhance suppression of conditioned avoidance responses. Dopamine D_{2} receptor partial agonists like aripiprazole, brexpiprazole, and bifeprunox suppress conditioned avoidance responses in the CAR test similarly to dopamine D_{2} receptor antagonists.

Other drugs that may produce or enhance suppression of conditioned avoidance responses include serotonin 5-HT_{2C} receptor agonists like CP-809101, WAY-163909, and meta-chlorophenylpiperazine (mCPP); α_{1}-adrenergic receptor antagonists like prazosin; α_{2}-adrenergic receptor antagonists like idazoxan; norepinephrine reuptake inhibitors like reboxetine; acetylcholinesterase inhibitors (and hence indirect cholinergics) like galantamine; the muscarinic acetylcholine receptor agonist xanomeline (used clinically as xanomeline/trospium); κ-opioid receptor agonists like spiradoline; AMPA receptor antagonists like GYKI-52466 and tezampanel (LY-326325); metabotropic glutamate mGlu_{2} and mGlu_{3} receptor agonists like pomaglumetad (LY-404039); and phosphodiesterase inhibitors like the PDE4 inhibitor rolipram and the PDE10A inhibitors papaverine, mardepodect (PF-2545920), and balipodect (TAK-063).

Dopamine D_{1} receptor antagonists have either shown no effect in the CAR, for instance ecopipam (SCH-39166), or have inhibited both avoidance and escape responses at the same doses, such as SCH-23390. However, different findings have also been reported, for instance ecopipam being effective in the CAR test. In contrast to dopamine D_{2} receptor antagonists, clinical trials of dopamine D_{1} receptor antagonists, including ecopipam and NNC 01-0687, have found that they were ineffective in the treatment of psychosis.

=== Inactive drugs ===
Various antidepressants, like tricyclic antidepressants (TCAs) as well as the selective serotonin reuptake inhibitor (SSRI) fluoxetine, reduce both avoidance and escape responses in the CAR test and hence are not considered to be active since they are not selective for avoidance responses.

=== Reversal agents ===
Dopaminergic agents, like the dopamine precursor levodopa (L-DOPA), the dopamine releasing agents amphetamine and methamphetamine, the dopamine reuptake inhibitors methylphenidate, bupropion, and nomifensine, the non-selective dopamine receptor agonist apomorphine, and the indirect dopaminergic agent amantadine, can all markedly reverse the effects of drugs like reserpine that are active in the CAR test and restore conditioned avoidance responses. Selective dopamine D_{1} receptor agonists, like SKF-38,393, and selective dopamine D_{2} receptor agonists, like quinpirole, are only weakly effective in reversing the effects of reserpine in suppressing conditioned avoidance responses when given individually. However, they are synergistic and robustly effective when administered in combination. Similarly, anticholinergics like atropine and scopolamine increase rates of conditioned avoidance responses. In contrast to dopaminergic agents, non-dopaminergic antidepressants, like many tricyclic antidepressants (TCAs), are generally ineffective in antagonizing agents that are active in the test.

== Mechanism ==
The effects of drugs that are active in the CAR test, suppression of conditioned avoidance responses without affecting escape behavior, are thought to be mediated specifically by modulation of signaling in the nucleus accumbens shell or ventral striatum, part of the mesolimbic pathway. This area of the brain plays a major role in behavioral activation and in appetitive and aversive motivational processes. Drugs active in the CAR test may work by dampening behavioral responses to motivationally salient stimuli.

Some academics, such as Joanna Moncrieff and David Healy, maintain that antipsychotics do not actually directly treat psychotic symptoms or delusions, but rather simply induce a state of psychic indifference or blunted emotions and resultant behavioral suppression (e.g., of agitation), thereby helping to reduce the functional consequences of psychotic symptoms. This interpretation is notably consistent with the behavioral effects of antipsychotics in the CAR test, in which treated animals lose their interest or motivation in preemptively avoiding an unpleasant stimulus.

== History ==
The CAR test was developed in the 1950s soon after the discovery of antipsychotics. It is one of the oldest and most classical tests of antipsychotic-like activity. The test was originally performed as the one-way active avoidance or pole-jumping test, but subsequently the two-way active avoidance test was introduced and became more commonly used. By 1998, the popularity of the CAR test had declined somewhat, but it continues to be frequently employed.

== Test of other drug effects ==
The CAR test can additionally be used to assess behavioral activity or drive and associated learning. The dopamine depleting agent tetrabenazine can strongly and almost completely inhibit acquisition of conditioned avoidance responses in the shuttle box and also results in a very high rate of escape failures. Dopaminergic agents, like the catecholaminergic activity enhancers selegiline, phenylpropylaminopentane (PPAP), and benzofuranylpropylaminopentane (BPAP), can reverse the effects of tetrabenazine and enhance learning in this test.

In addition, the CAR test, by testing the capacity of drugs to enhance escape responses and thereby reverse learned helplessness, has been used as a test of antidepressant-like activity. κ-Opioid receptor antagonists like norbinaltorphimine have been found to be active in this test.

Acquisition of conditioned avoidance responses has been used as a test of anxiolytic and anxiogenic drug effects.

Since there is a learning (acquisition) phase, there have also been attempts to use the CAR test to assess activity of drugs in enhancing learning and memory. However, there have been no consistent data for this use. In addition, the CAR test may be inducing more of a behavioral reflex rather than involving higher-order memory associated with areas like the prefrontal cortex.

== Other tests of antipsychotic-like activity ==
Other animal tests used to evaluate antipsychotic-like activity of drugs include inhibition of drug-induced stereotypy, inhibition of drug-induced hyperlocomotion or climbing behavior, and reversal of drug-induced prepulse inhibition or startle response deficits. Drugs that induce such effects include dopaminergic agents like amphetamine and apomorphine and NMDA receptor antagonists like dizocilpine (MK-801). Another test of antipsychotic-like activity is restoration of latent inhibition.

== See also ==
- Animal model of schizophrenia
- Dopamine hypothesis of schizophrenia
