= Balipodect =

Abandoned PDE10A inhibitor

Clinical data
- Other names: TAK-063; TAK063
- Drug class: Phosphodiesterase inhibitor; PDE10A inhibitor; Antipsychotic

Identifiers
- IUPAC name: 1-(2-fluoro-4-pyrazol-1-ylphenyl)-5-methoxy-3-(2-phenylpyrazol-3-yl)pyridazin-4-one
- CAS Number: 1238697-26-1
- PubChem CID: 46848915
- DrugBank: DB14774
- ChemSpider: 35035198
- UNII: 6650W303H0
- KEGG: D11245
- ChEMBL: ChEMBL3989972

Chemical and physical data
- Formula: C_{23}H_{17}FN_{6}O_{2}
- Molar mass: 428.427 g·mol^{−1}
- 3D model (JSmol): Interactive image
- SMILES: COC1=CN(N=C(C1=O)C2=CC=NN2C3=CC=CC=C3)C4=C(C=C(C=C4)N5C=CC=N5)F
- InChI: InChI=1S/C23H17FN6O2/c1-32-21-15-29(19-9-8-17(14-18(19)24)28-13-5-11-25-28)27-22(23(21)31)20-10-12-26-30(20)16-6-3-2-4-7-16/h2-15H,1H3; Key:KVHRYLNQDWXAGI-UHFFFAOYSA-N

Balipodect (INN, USAN; developmental code name TAK-063) is a selective phosphodiesterase 10A (PDE10A) inhibitor which was under development by Takeda for the treatment of schizophrenia.

It is active in animal models of antipsychotic-like activity, including inhibition of hyperlocomotion induced by the NMDA receptor antagonist dizocilpine (MK-801) or the dopamine releasing agent methamphetamine, inhibition of conditioned avoidance responses, and reversal of prepulse inhibition deficits.

The drug reached phase 2 clinical trials for this indication but its development was discontinued. It was reported to be poorly effective or ineffective for schizophrenia in clinical trials.

== See also ==
- List of investigational antipsychotics
- List of investigational Tourette's syndrome drugs
- Mardepodect
- MK-8189
- Osoresnontrine
- Papaverine
- Rolipram
- Tofisopam
