= Prepulse inhibition =

Neurological phenomenon

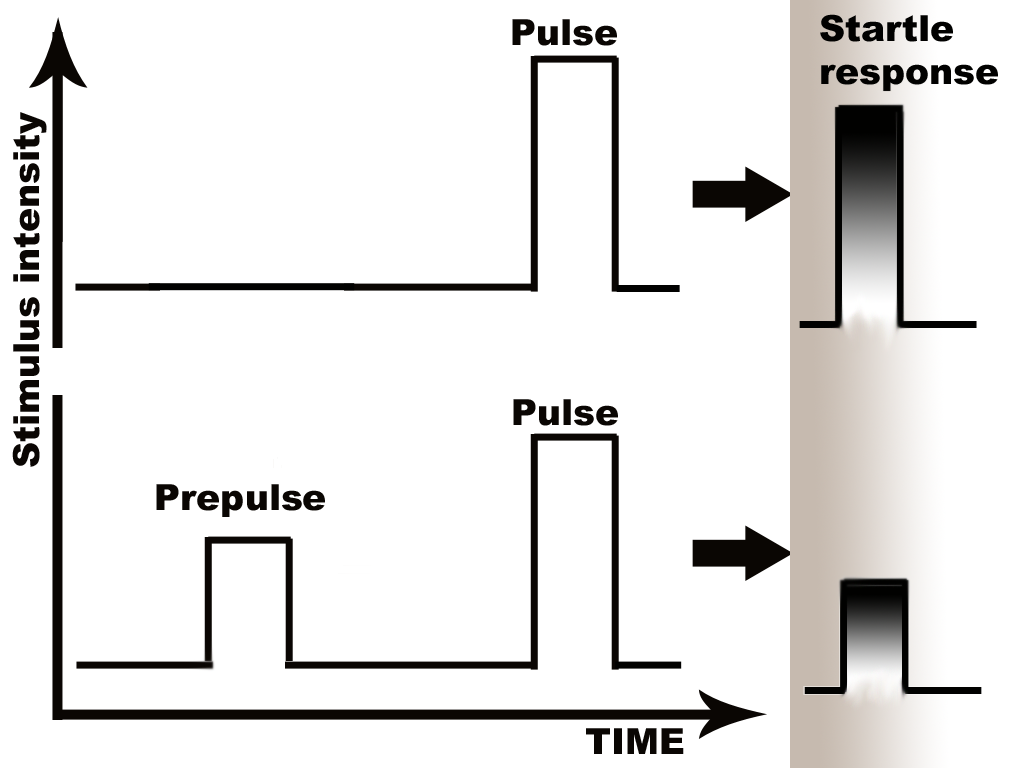
Prepulse inhibition: preceding stimulus attenuates the startle response.

Prepulse inhibition (PPI) is a neurological phenomenon in which a weaker prestimulus (prepulse) inhibits the reaction of an organism to a subsequent strong reflex-eliciting stimulus (pulse), often using the startle reflex. The stimuli are usually acoustic, but tactile stimuli (e.g. via air puffs onto the skin) and light stimuli are also used. When prepulse inhibition is high, the corresponding one-time startle response is reduced.

The reduction of the amplitude of startle reflects the ability of the nervous system to temporarily adapt to a strong sensory stimulus when a preceding weaker signal is given to warn the organism. PPI is detected in numerous species including mice and humans. Although the extent of the adaptation affects numerous systems, the most comfortable to measure are the muscular reactions, which are normally diminished as a result of the nervous inhibition.

Deficits of prepulse inhibition manifest in the inability to filter out the unnecessary information; they have been linked to abnormalities of sensorimotor gating. Such deficits are noted in patients with conditions like schizophrenia and Alzheimer's disease, and in people under the influence of drugs, surgical manipulations, or mutations. Human studies of PPI have been summarised in reviews by Braff et al. (2001) and Swerdlow et al. (2008).

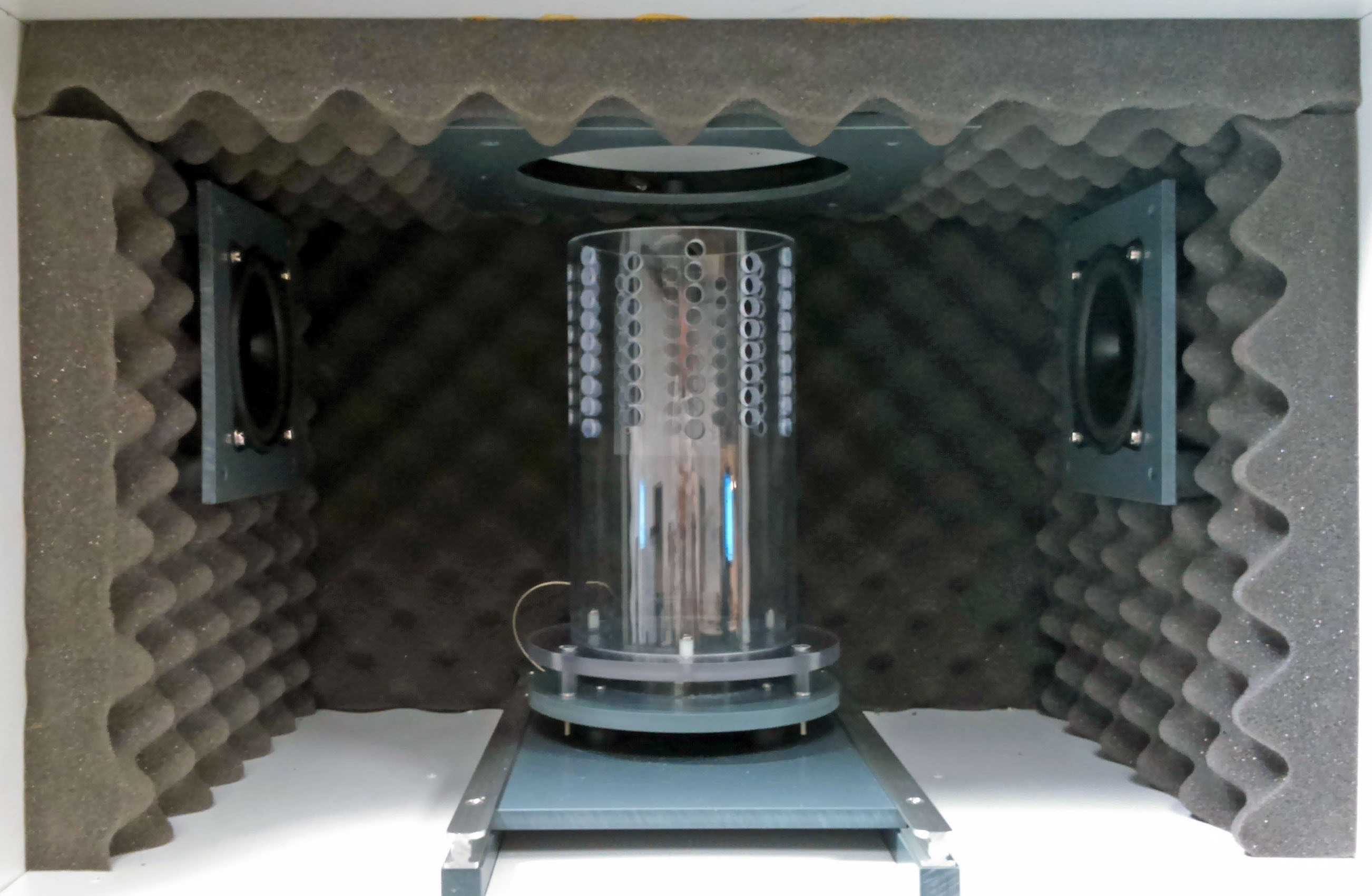
PPI and startle reflex apparatus for mice

== Procedure ==
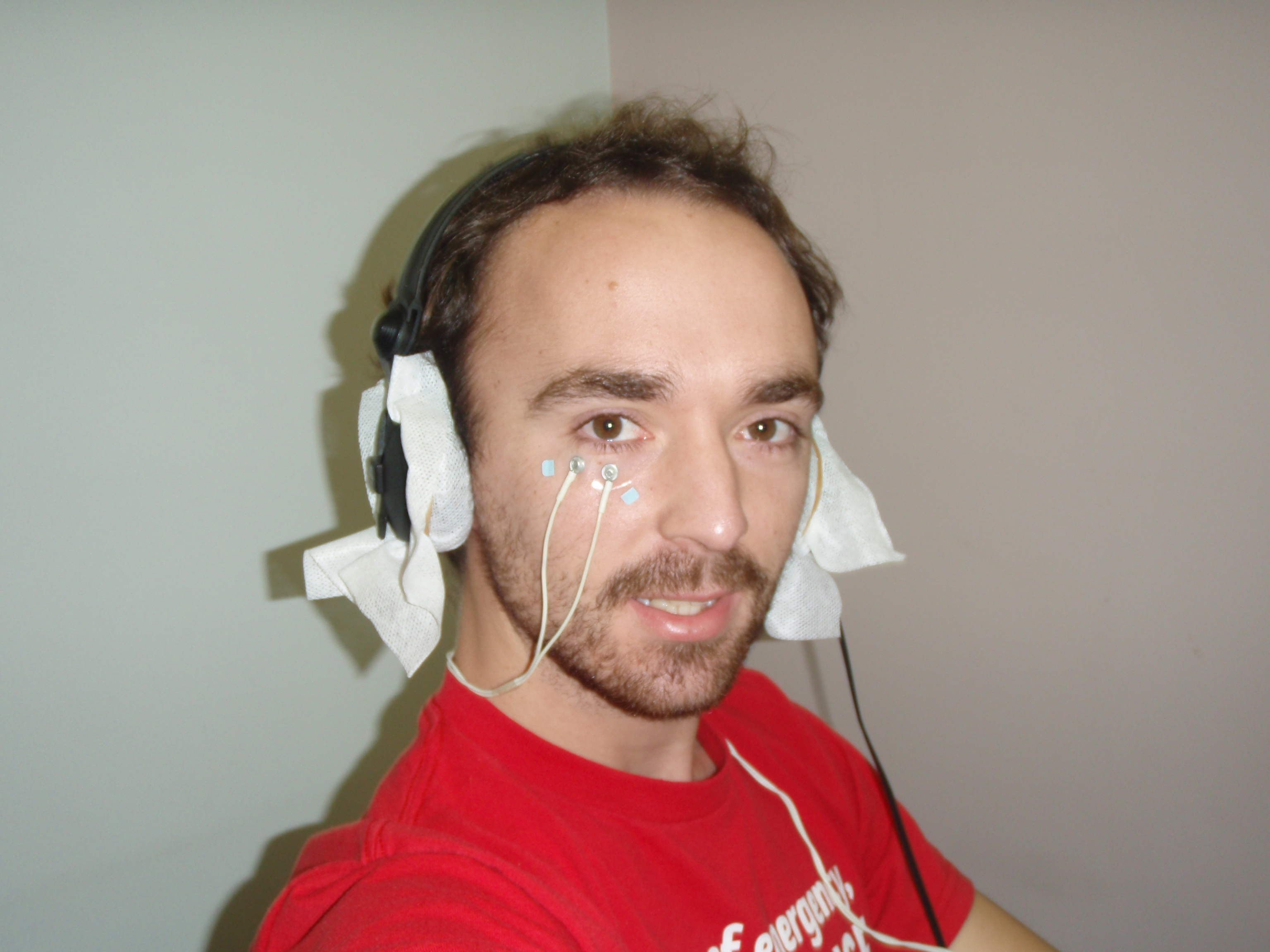
PPI measurement in human.

The main three parts of the procedure are prepulse, startle stimulus, and startle reflex. Different prepulse-to-pulse intervals, or lead intervals, are used: 30, 60, 120, 240 and 480 ms. Lead interval counts from the start of prepulse to the start of the pulse. With the interval exceeding 500 ms, prepulse facilitation – increased response – is most likely to follow.

A burst of white noise is usually used as the acoustic startle stimulus. Typical durations are 20 ms for prepulse and 40 ms for pulse. Background noise with 65-70 dB is used in human studies, and 30–40 dB in rodent experiments. Prepulse is typically set 3–12 dB louder than background. Startle response is measured in rodents using the so-called automated "startle chambers" or "stabilimeter chambers", with detectors recording whole-body reaction.

In humans, the movements of oculomotor muscles ("eye-blink reflex" or "eye-blink response" assessed using electromyographic recording of orbicularis oculi muscle and by oculography) could be used as a measure. Pulse-alone results are compared to prepulse-plus-pulse, and the percentage of the reduction in the startle reflex represents prepulse inhibition. Possible hearing impairment must be taken into account, as, for example, several strains of mice develop high frequency hearing loss when they mature.

The recorded signal needs to be passband filtered between 28 Hz and 500 Hz. By this step, artifacts from eye movements and muscle activity independent of blink responses are removed. To avoid aliasing artifacts the sampling rate of the signal should be at least 1024 Hz which is larger than twice the upper bound of the bandpass filter (twice the Nyquist frequency). After filtering, the resulting signal is rectified and smoothed.

Reporting the signal deflection evoked by the startle stimulus, the term mean amplitude (mA) refers to the average startle response excluding nonresponse trials. However, to calculate the mean magnitude (mM), nonresponse trials are set to zero before averaging. Dividing the number detected responses (number of trials used to compute amplitude) by the total number of eliciting stimuli yields the response probability (P). Thus, increasing response probability shifts average response magnitude towards average response amplitude.

$mM = mA \times P$

It is recommend to use the computed mean magnitude to report the average startle response. Since this metric includes also nonresponse measures, it exhibits increased validity compared to mean amplitude.

== Major features ==
The magnitude of PPI is often significant, reaching as much as 65% in healthy subjects, with maximum inhibition is typically observed at 120 ms interval. The baseline startle response does not affect overall PPI levels – this finding was first discovered in rat studies and later duplicated in the studies of mice. The opposite reaction, Prepulse Facilitation (PPF)-- the tendency for a subject to have an increased startle response following a lower-intensity prepulse stimulus—is typically noted when the interval between stimuli lasts longer than 500 ms. PPF is thought to reflect, at least partially, sustained attention: the prepulse, if not followed within less than half a second by the pulse, will tend to make the subject more likely to have a startle response rather than less.

Another moderating variable in prepulse inhibition and facilitation is sex difference, with men having higher PPI (i.e., when a prepulse is quickly followed by a pulse, all subjects tend to experience a reduced startle response, with men often experiencing lesser startle responses compared to women) and women having higher PPF (i.e., when the prepulse occurs more than half a second before the pulse, all subjects tend to experience heightened startle responses, with women tending to experience greater startle responses than men). For acoustic stimuli, monaural PPI is higher than binaural—the startle response is reduced when the stimulus (noise) is only experienced in one ear rather than both ears. Even the very first prepulse of a test session induces inhibition, which indicates that conditioning and learning are not necessary for this effect to occur. However, the lack of conditionality has been questioned. However a thousandth prepulse also induces inhibition; the phenomenon is highly robust

Response and reaction are affected by interval duration and attention. It is thought that the short intervals used in PPI task do not give enough time for the activation of a volitional response: the reaction to pulses and prepulses separated by short time frames is believed to be involuntary. Prepulses could be attended or ignored, and attention affects the outcome. In one study, normal college students were instructed to attend to one of the kind of prepulses, high- or low-pitched, and ignore the other. Attended prepulse caused significantly greater inhibition at the 120 ms interval compared to the ignored one, and significantly greater facilitation at the 2000 ms interval. This reflects the tendency of subjects to expect to hear a particular frequency of pulsed sound, an effect that is highly pronounced when the prepulse occurs two seconds before the pulse and when there are other pulses being heard which are being consciously "ignored". Increased prepulse duration leads to increase in PPI: the longer the prepulse, the greater the reduction in subsequent startle responses. Steady background noise facilitates the startle response, while pulsed background produces inhibition.

== History of scientific work ==
Prepulse inhibition was first described in 1862 by Sechenov and was rediscovered at least twice before Howard S. Hoffman discovered it again in 1963. Hoffman was the first to use the term prepulse. He continued his work on startle into the 1980s. His many papers on the reflex and its modification laid the groundwork for the widespread use of prepulse inhibition today in studies of schizophrenia and other disorders.

One possible reason it was discovered and rediscovered is that it got confused with Pavlovian conditioning. Another is that it didn't fit nicely into theories of the times.

== Disruption ==
Disruptions of PPI are studied in humans and many other species. The most studied are deficits of PPI in schizophrenia, although this disease is not the only one to be associated with such deficits. They have been noted in panic disorder (Ludewig, et al., 2005), schizotypal personality disorder, obsessive-compulsive disorder (Swerdlow et al., 1993), Huntington's disease, nocturnal enuresis and attention deficit disorder (Ornitz et al. 1992), and Tourette's syndrome (Swerdlow et al. 1994; Castellanos et al. 1996). According to one study, people who have temporal lobe epilepsy with psychosis also show decreases in PPI, unlike those who have TLE without psychosis. Therefore, PPI deficits are not typical to specific disease, but rather tell of disruptions in a specific brain circuit.

=== PPI deficit in schizophrenia ===
PPI deficits represent a well-described finding in schizophrenia, with the first report dating back to 1978. The abnormalities are also noted in unaffected relatives of the patients. In one study, patients failed to show increased PPI to attended prepulses. Dopamine, which plays a major role in schizophrenia, had been shown to regulate sensorimotor gating in rodent models. These findings fit to the dopamine hypothesis of schizophrenia. In theory, PPI disruption in schizophrenia may be related to the processes of sensory flooding and cognitive fragmentation. This makes disrupted PPI potentially useful as an endophenotype in the diagnosis of schizophrenia.

Antipsychotic medication have been shown to increase PPI in patients, with atypical antipsychotics having more effect. Patients display the same gender difference in PPI as healthy people: males have higher PPI compared to females. One notable finding is that patients are specifically deficient in PPI with 60 ms prepulse intervals relative to intervals of other lengths; this remains so even under antipsychotic treatment.

The other fact is the influence of cigarette smoking: the research suggests that smoking does indeed "calm the nerves". Non-smoking patients have lower PPI compared to smokers, and heavy smokers have the highest PPI. This finding runs in accord with the high rates of smoking among schizophrenic patients, estimated at 70%, with many patients smoking more than 30 cigarettes a day. Some studies show association of schizophrenia with the CHRNA7 and CHRFAM7A genes, which code for alpha7 subunit of nicotinic receptors, but other studies are negative. Contrary to the predictions, nicotine receptor alpha7 subunit knockout mice do not show disruptions in PPI.

=== In rodents ===
Murine models are widely used to test hypotheses linking genetic components of various diseases with sensorimotor gating. While some of the hypotheses stand to the test, others are not, as some mice models show unchanged or increased PPI contrary to the expectations, as in the tests of COMT-deficient mice.

Certain surgical procedures also disrupt PPI in animals, helping to unravel the underlying circuitry.

Many animal studies of PPI are undertaken in order to understand and model the pathology of schizophrenia. Schizophrenia-like PPI disruption techniques in rodents have been classified in one review into four models:

- PPI impairment driven by dopamine receptor agonists, most validated for antipsychotic studies;
- PPI impairment by serotonin 5-HT_{2A} receptor agonists or serotonergic psychedelics;
- PPI impairment by NMDA receptor antagonists;
- PPI impairment by developmental intervention (isolation rearing, maternal deprivation).

Diverse chemical compounds are tested on animals with such deficits. Compounds that are able to restore PPI could be further investigated for their potential antipsychotic role.

PPI disruption may be useful animal bioassay to predict psychedelic effects with serotonin 5-HT_{2A} receptor agonists. Other available tests in this area include the head-twitch response assay and drug discrimination.

A review of the genetic underpinnings of prepulse inhibition can be found in a meta-analysis conducted by Quednow et al. (2017). Additionally an updated summary of both preclinical and clinical findings with PPI can be found in a recent comprehensive review.

== See also ==
- Latent inhibition
- Conditioned avoidance response test
