= List of investigational sleep apnea drugs =

Investigational sleep apnea drugs

This is a list of investigational sleep apnea drugs, or drugs that are currently under development for clinical use in the treatment of sleep apnea but are not yet approved.

Chemical/generic names are listed first, with developmental code names, synonyms, and brand names in parentheses. The format of list items is "Name (Synonyms) – Mechanism of Action [Reference]".

This list was last comprehensively updated in September 2025. It is likely to become outdated with time.

== Under development ==
=== Phase 3 ===
- Aroxybutynin/atomoxetine (AD-109; atomoxetine/aroxybutynin) – combination of aroxybutynin (muscarinic acetylcholine receptor antagonist/anticholinergic) and atomoxetine (norepinephrine reuptake inhibitor) ,
- Mazdutide (IBI-362; LY-3305677; OXM-3) – glucagon-like peptide-1 (GLP-1) receptor agonist and glucagon receptor agonist – obesity-related sleep apnea
- Orforglipron (LY-3502970; OWL-833) – glucagon-like peptide-1 (GLP-1) receptor agonist – obesity-related sleep apnea
- Retatrutide (LY-3437943) – glucagon-like peptide-1 (GLP-1) receptor agonist, glucagon receptor agonist, and gastric inhibitory polypeptide (GIP) receptor agonist – obesity-related sleep apnea

=== Phase 2/3 ===
- Acetazolamide/dronabinol (IHL-42X) – combination of acetazolamide (carbonic anhydrase inhibitor) and dronabinol (cannabinoid receptor agonist)

=== Phase 2 ===
- AD-036 – undefined mechanism of action
- Atomoxetine/mineralocorticoid receptor antagonist (atomoxetine/antimineralocorticoid; AD-113) – combination of atomoxetine (norepinephrine reuptake inhibitor) and a mineralocorticoid receptor antagonist
- Atomoxetine/trazodone (trazodone/atomoxetine; AD-504) – combination of atomoxetine (norepinephrine reuptake inhibitor) and trazodone (various actions/hypnotic)
- BAY-2586116 – potassium channel blocker
- CX-1739 – ampakine (AMPA receptor positive allosteric modulator)
- Dronabinol low-dose (tetrahydrocannabinol; THC; PP-001) – cannabinoid CB_{1} and CB_{2} receptor agonist
- Dronabinol/palmidrol (SCI-110; THX-OSA01; THX-RS01; THX-110; THX-TS01; THC/PEA) – combination of dronabinol (THC; cannabinoid receptor agonist) and palmidrol (palmitoylethanolamine (PEA); various actions)
- Lorundrostat (MLS-101; MT-4129) – aldosterone synthase (CYP11B2) inhibitor
- Phentermine/topiramate (Qnexa; Qsiva; Qsymia; topiramate/phentermine; VI-0521) – combination of phentermine (norepinephrine releasing agent) and topiramate (various actions)
- Research programme: Sleep disordered breathing therapeutics - Shinogi-Apnimed Sleep Science – undefined mechanisms of action
- SASS-001 – purinergic P2X3 receptor antagonist
- Sivopixant (S-600918) – purinergic P2X3 receptor antagonist
- Sulthiame (SASS-002; sulthiame; Sultia; sultiame) – carbonic anhydrase inhibitor
- Trazodone/viloxazine (AD-816; viloxazine/trazodone) – combination of trazodone (various actions/hypnotic) and viloxazine (norepinephrine reuptake inhibitor)

=== Phase 1 ===
- BAY-2925976 (KRP-S124) – α_{2C}-adrenergic receptor antagonist
- Gal-475 – chemoreceptor cell modulator
- MOS-118 (AVE-0118) – potassium channel blocker

== Not under development ==
=== No development reported ===
- Atomoxetine/orexin antagonist (AD-182) – combination of atomoxetine (norepinephrine reuptake inhibitor) and an orexin receptor antagonist
- Daridorexant (ACT-541468; nemorexant; Quviviq) – orexin OX_{1} and OX_{2} receptor antagonist
- Lemborexant (Dayvigo; E-2006; LEM) – orexin OX_{1} and OX_{2} receptor antagonist
- Research programme: AMPA receptor agonists - RespireRx (ampakines; CX compounds) – ampakines (AMPA receptor positive allosteric modulators) and brain-derived neurotrophic factor (BDNF) stimulants
- Research programme: sleep apnoea therapeutics - Apnimed – undefined mechanism of action
- Seltorexant (JNJ-42847922; JNJ-7922; MIN-202) – orexin OX_{2} receptor antagonist
- Vornorexant (ORN-0829; TS-142) – orexin OX_{1} and OX_{2} receptor antagonist

=== Discontinued ===
- AVE-0657 – sodium–hydrogen antiporter inhibitor
- Danavorexton (TAK-925) – orexin OX_{2} receptor agonist
- Dexloxiglumide (CR-2017) – cholecystokinin A (CCK_{A}) receptor antagonist
- Gefapixant (AF-219; Gefzuris; Lyfnua; MK-7264; R-1646; RG-1646; RO-4926219) – purinergic P2X3 receptor antagonist
- Itriglumide (CR-2945) – cholecystokinin B (CCK_{B}) receptor antagonist
- Sleep apnoea therapeutic (TASK channel blocker) – potassium channel blocker

== Clinically used drugs ==
=== Approved drugs ===
- Tirzepatide (LY-3298176; Mounjaro; Zepbound) – glucagon-like peptide-1 (GLP-1) receptor agonist and gastric inhibitory polypeptide (GIP) receptor agonist – obesity-related sleep apnea

=== Off-label drugs ===
- Acetazolamide (Diamox) – carbonic anhydrase inhibitor
- Atomoxetine (Strattera) – norepinephrine reuptake inhibitor (NRI)
- Eszopiclone (Lunesta) – GABA_{A} receptor positive allosteric modulator and nonbenzodiazepine/Z-drug
- Oxybutynin (Ditropan) – muscarinic acetylcholine receptor antagonist (anticholinergic)
- Pimavanserin (Nuplaizid) – serotonin 5-HT_{2A} receptor antagonist
- Sodium oxybate (GHB; Xyrem) – GABA_{B} receptor agonist and GHB receptor agonist
- Trazodone (Desyrel) – various actions
- Weight-loss drugs (e.g., liraglutide, semaglutide) – obesity-related sleep apnea

== See also ==
- Lists of investigational drugs
