= Dronabinol/palmidrol =

- Dronabinol

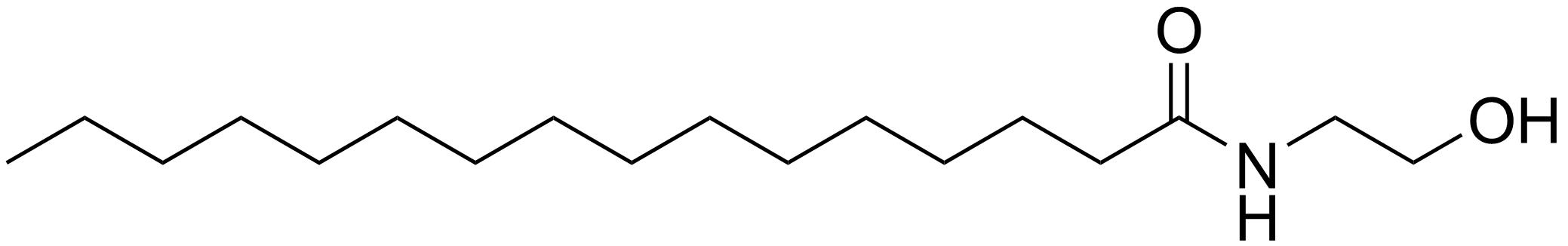
- Palmidrol

Combination of
- Dronabinol: Cannabinoid CB_{1} and CB_{2} receptor agonist
- Palmidrol: Endocannabinoid-like fatty acid amide

Clinical data
- Other names: Dronabinol/palmitoylethanolamide; Δ^{9}-Tetrahydrocannabinol/palmitoylethanolamide; Δ^{9}-THC/PEA; SCI-110; SCI110; THX-OSA01; THX-OSA01; THX-RS01; THX-110; THX110; THX-TS01
- Routes of administration: Oral

Dronabinol/palmidrol (developmental code names SCI-110, THX-OSA01, THX-RS01, THX-110, and THX-TS01), also known as Δ^{9}-tetrahydrocannabinol/palmitoylethanolamide (THC/PEA), is a combination of dronabinol (Δ^{9}-THC), a cannabinoid CB_{1} and CB_{2} receptor agonist, and palmidrol (palmitoylethanolamide; PEA), an endocannabinoid-like fatty acid amide with various cannabidiol (CBD)-like actions, which is under development for the treatment of agitation, Alzheimer's disease, Tourette's syndrome, and sleep apnea syndrome. It was also under development for treatment of back pain, but development for this indication was discontinued. The drug is taken orally. It is thought that palmidrol may enhance the effectiveness and tolerability compared to dronabinol alone. The drug was originated by Therapix Biosciences and is being developed by SciSparc. As of September 2025, the drug is in phase 2 clinical trials for all active indications.

== See also ==
- List of investigational agitation drugs
- List of investigational Tourette's syndrome drugs
- List of investigational sleep apnea drugs
