= List of investigational Tourette's syndrome drugs =

Investigational Tourette's syndrome drugs

This is a list of investigational Tourette's syndrome drugs, or drugs that are currently under development for clinical use for the treatment of Tourette's syndrome (TS) but are not yet approved.

Chemical/generic names are listed first, with developmental code names, synonyms, and brand names in parentheses. The format of list items is "Name (Synonyms) – Mechanism of Action [Reference]".

This list was last comprehensively updated in May 2026. It is likely to become outdated with time.

== Under development ==
=== Phase 3 ===
- Ecopipam (EBS-101; PSYRX 101; SCH-39166) – dopamine D_{1} receptor antagonist

=== Phase 2 ===
- Botulinum toxin A (AboBoNT-A; abobotulinumtoxinA; Alluzience; Azzalure; BoNT-A; BTX-A-HAC; BTX-A-HAC NG; Clostridium botulinum toxin type A haemagglutinin complex; Dysport; Reloxin) – acetylcholine release inhibitor and neuromuscular blocking agent
- CPP-115 – GABA transaminase (GABA-T) inhibitor
- Dronabinol/palmidrol (THC/PEA; SCI-110; THX OSA01; THX-RS01; THX-110; THX-TS01) – combination of dronabinol (Δ^{9}-THC; cannabinoid CB_{1} and CB_{2} receptor agonist) and palmidrol (palmitoylethanolamide (PEA) various actions)
- EM-221 – phosphodiesterase PDE10A inhibitor
- Gemlapodect (NOE-105) – phosphodiesterase PDE10A inhibitor
- Sepranolone (isoallopregnanolone; UC-1010) – GABA_{A} receptor negative allosteric modulator and neurosteroid
- Valbenazine (Dysval; Ingrezza; MT-5199; NBI-98854; Remleas) – vesicular monoamine transporter 2 (VMAT2) inhibitor

=== Phase 1 ===
- Balipodect (AXS-20; TAK-063) – phosphodiesterase PDE10A inhibitor

== Not under development ==
=== No development reported ===
- Seridopidine (ACR343; ACR-343) – dopamine receptor modulator and so-called "dopaminergic stabilizer"
- Vatiquinone (α-tocotrienol quinone; EPI-743; PTC-743; vincerenone) – arachidonate 15-lipoxygenase (ALOX-15) inhibitor, other actions

=== Discontinued ===
- Acamprosate controlled-release (calcium N-acetylhomotaurinate; SNC-102) – various actions
- AZD-5213 (AZD5213) – histamine H_{3} receptor antagonist
- Brilaroxazine (RP-5000; RP-5063) – atypical antipsychotic (non-selective monoamine receptor modulator)
- Elcubragistat (ABX-1431; Lu AG06466) – monoacylglycerol lipase (MAGL) inhibitor
- Onabotulinum toxin A (BoNTA; Botox; botulinum toxin A; GSK-1358820; OnabotA X; OnabotulinumtoxinA X; Vistabel; Vistabex) – acetylcholine release inhibitor and neuromuscular blocking agent
- Tetrabenazine (BVF-018; Choreazine; Nitoman; Xenazina; Xenazine) – vesicular monoamine transporter 2 (VMAT2) inhibitor

== Clinically used drugs ==
=== Approved drugs ===
- Aripiprazole (Abilify; Abilify Asimtufii; Abilify Maintena; Abilify MyCite; Abilitat; Ao Pai; Arlemide; Asimtufii; OPC-14597; OPC-31) – atypical antipsychotic (non-selective monoamine receptor modulator)
- Deutetrabenazine (Austedo; d6-tetrabenazine; deuterium-substituted tetrabenazine; SD-809; TEV-50717) – vesicular monoamine transporter 2 (VMAT2) inhibitor

=== Off-label drugs ===
- α_{2}-Adrenergic receptor agonists (e.g., clonidine, guanfacine)
- Antipsychotics (dopamine D_{2} receptor antagonists) (e.g., fluphenazine, haloperidol, olanzapine, paliperidone, pimozide, risperidone, sertindole, tiapride, ziprasidone)
- Cannabinoids (e.g., cannabis, Δ^{9}-tetrahydrocannabinol (Δ^{9}-THC))
- Dopamine D_{2}-like receptor agonists (e.g., pergolide, pramipexole)
- GABA_{B} receptor agonists (e.g., baclofen)
- Selective serotonin reuptake inhibitors (SSRIs) (e.g., fluoxetine, fluvoxamine, sertraline)
- Tricyclic antidepressants (TCAs) (e.g., clomipramine)
- VMAT2 inhibitors (e.g., tetrabenazine)
- Others (e.g., botulinum toxin A, clonazepam, levetiracetam, topiramate)

== See also ==
- List of investigational drugs
- Management of Tourette syndrome
