= CHRFAM7A =

Protein-coding gene in humans

Available structures
PDB	Ortholog search: PDBe RCSB
PDB	List of PDB id codes 5AFK, 5AFJ, 5AFL, 2MAW, 5AFN, 5AFM, 5AFH

Identifiers
- Aliases: CHRFAM7A, CHRNA7, CHRNA7-DR1, D-10, CHRNA7 (exons 5-10) and FAM7A (exons A-E) fusion, NACHRA7
- External IDs: OMIM: 609756; MGI: 99779; GeneCards: CHRFAM7A; OMA:CHRFAM7A - orthologs

Gene location (Human)
Chr.	Chromosome 15 (human)
Band	15q13.2	Start	30,360,566 bp
Band	15q13.2	End	30,393,849 bp

Gene location (Mouse)
Chr.	Chromosome 7 (mouse)
Band	7 C|7 34.47 cM	Start	62,748,440 bp
Band	7 C|7 34.47 cM	End	62,862,317 bp
RNA expression pattern
Bgee	Human / Mouse (ortholog); Top expressed in: gonad; testicle; Achilles tendon; Descending thoracic aorta; monocyte; ascending aorta; bone marrow; right lung; thyroid gland; smooth muscle tissue / Top expressed in: trigeminal nerve; dentate gyrus of hippocampal formation granule cell; lumbar spinal ganglion; primary visual cortex; tail of embryo; autonomic nervous system; superior frontal gyrus; sympathetic ganglion; paravertebral ganglia; tongue; More reference expression data
BioGPS	n/a
Gene ontology
Molecular function	extracellular ligand-gated ion channel activity; ion channel activity; transmembrane signaling receptor activity; acetylcholine receptor activity; acetylcholine binding; protein binding; protein homodimerization activity; acetylcholine-gated cation-selective channel activity; amyloid-beta binding; chloride channel regulator activity; toxic substance binding; ligand-gated ion channel activity; calcium channel activity
Cellular component	integral component of membrane; membrane; integral component of plasma membrane; acetylcholine-gated channel complex; neuron projection; synapse; postsynaptic membrane; plasma membrane; cell junction; plasma membrane raft; postsynapse
Biological process	ion transmembrane transport; ion transport; signal transduction; chemical synaptic transmission; synaptic transmission, cholinergic; regulation of membrane potential; nervous system process; response to hypoxia; cognition; cellular calcium ion homeostasis; positive regulation of angiogenesis; positive regulation of cell population proliferation; transport; calcium ion transport; memory; negative regulation of tumor necrosis factor production; response to nicotine; regulation of postsynaptic membrane potential; excitatory postsynaptic potential; positive regulation of protein phosphorylation; learning or memory; short-term memory; synapse organization; sensory processing; positive regulation of ERK1 and ERK2 cascade; calcium ion transmembrane transport; acetylcholine receptor signaling pathway; dendritic spine organization; modulation of excitatory postsynaptic potential; dendrite arborization; positive regulation of long-term synaptic potentiation; regulation of neuron death; positive regulation of amyloid-beta formation; negative regulation of amyloid-beta formation; regulation of amyloid precursor protein catabolic process; response to amyloid-beta; response to acetylcholine; regulation of amyloid fibril formation; positive regulation of CoA-transferase activity; positive regulation of excitatory postsynaptic potential
Sources:Amigo / QuickGO
Orthologs
Species	Human	Mouse
Entrez	89832	11441
Ensembl	ENSG00000275917; ENSG00000166664	ENSMUSG00000030525
UniProt	Q494W8; P36544	P49582
RefSeq (mRNA)	NM_139320; NM_148911	NM_007390
RefSeq (protein)	NP_647536; NP_683709; NP_000737; NP_001177384	NP_031416
Location (UCSC)	Chr 15: 30.36 – 30.39 Mb	Chr 7: 62.75 – 62.86 Mb
PubMed search
- Wikidata
View/Edit Human	View/Edit Mouse

CHRFAM7A is human specific gene located on chromosome 15. The region in which CHRFAM7A is located on chromosome 15 is referred to as chromosome 15q13 where the partial duplication of CHRNA7 occurs. CHRFAM7A is a fusion gene derived from the partial duplication of the CHRNA7 gene and FAM7A cassettes derived from the ULK4 gene.

CHRFAM7A encodes for a modified protein subunit known as dupɑ7 or dupɑ7nAChr. Dupɑ7 is a modified subunit of ɑ7 which lacks a portion of the extracellular N-terminal ligand binding domain and the membrane signal peptide. Dupɑ7 binds with ɑ7 to form heteromeric receptors that function as dominant negative regulators. This combination leads to reduced calcium influx by reducing the likelihood of the receptor's channel opening.

Since CHRFAM7A is only found in humans, it has been studied as a possible factor contributing to differences between human and animal research. CHRFAM7A has also been associated with psychiatric and cognitive disorders such as schizophrenia and Alzheimer's disease.

== Structure ==
CHRFAM7A is a human fusion gene formed by a partial duplication of CHRNA7 exons 5-10 and seven FAM7A cassette exons. The FAM7A cassette is composed of exons A,B,C, & E which are derived from a partial duplication of the ULK4 gene and exons D & F which are related to the GOLGA8B gene. CHRFAM7A is located on chromosome 15q13-q14 1.6 Mb centromeric to the CHRNA7 gene. This region of the chromosome has high instability and low copy repeats.

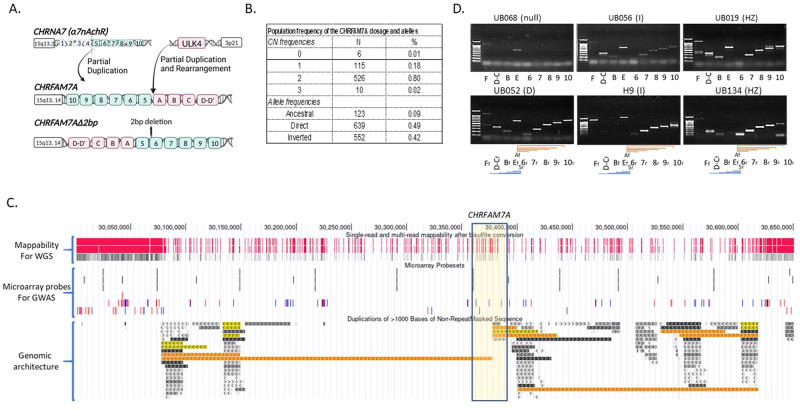
Fig.3 A Schematic depicting CHRFAM7A alleles.

CHRFAM7A has multiple variants and polymorphisms. It has two primary orientations known as direct allele and inverted allele. Direct allele is orientated in the opposite direction of CHRNA7 and the inverted allele is orientated in the same direction as CHRNA7. The inverted allele is associated with a 2 base pair deletion in exon 6 causing a frameshift mutation. CHRFAM7A also has copy number variation where individuals carry 0 to 3 copies of the gene. It also has a mutation at position 654 bp and a C→T transition at 1466 bp which results in a serine to leucine substitution at aa 489.

CHRFAM7A encodes for Dupɑ7 which is a truncated version of the ɑ7 nicotinic acetylcholine receptor subunit. It lacks the first 95 amino acids of ɑ7 as well as the signal peptide and a portion of the extracellular ligand binding domain. This results in dupɑ7 missing loops A and D of the acetylcholine binding domain site but still has all four transmembrane domains M1-M4, the intracellular M3-M4 loop, and the C-terminal. The molecular weight of dupɑ7 is around 45-50 kDa which is lighter compared to the ɑ7 subunit which is 55-57 kDa.

== Function ==
CHRFAM7A functions as a dominant negative regulator to the ɑ7 nicotinic acetylcholine receptor. Its protein product dupɑ7 binds with ɑ7 to form a heteromeric receptor. This results in a hypomorphic receptor formation reducing acetylcholine microscopic currents, channel opening, and calcium influx. In some lung cancers, the receptors hypomorphic response to nicotine may decrease cell proliferation, migration, and EMT.

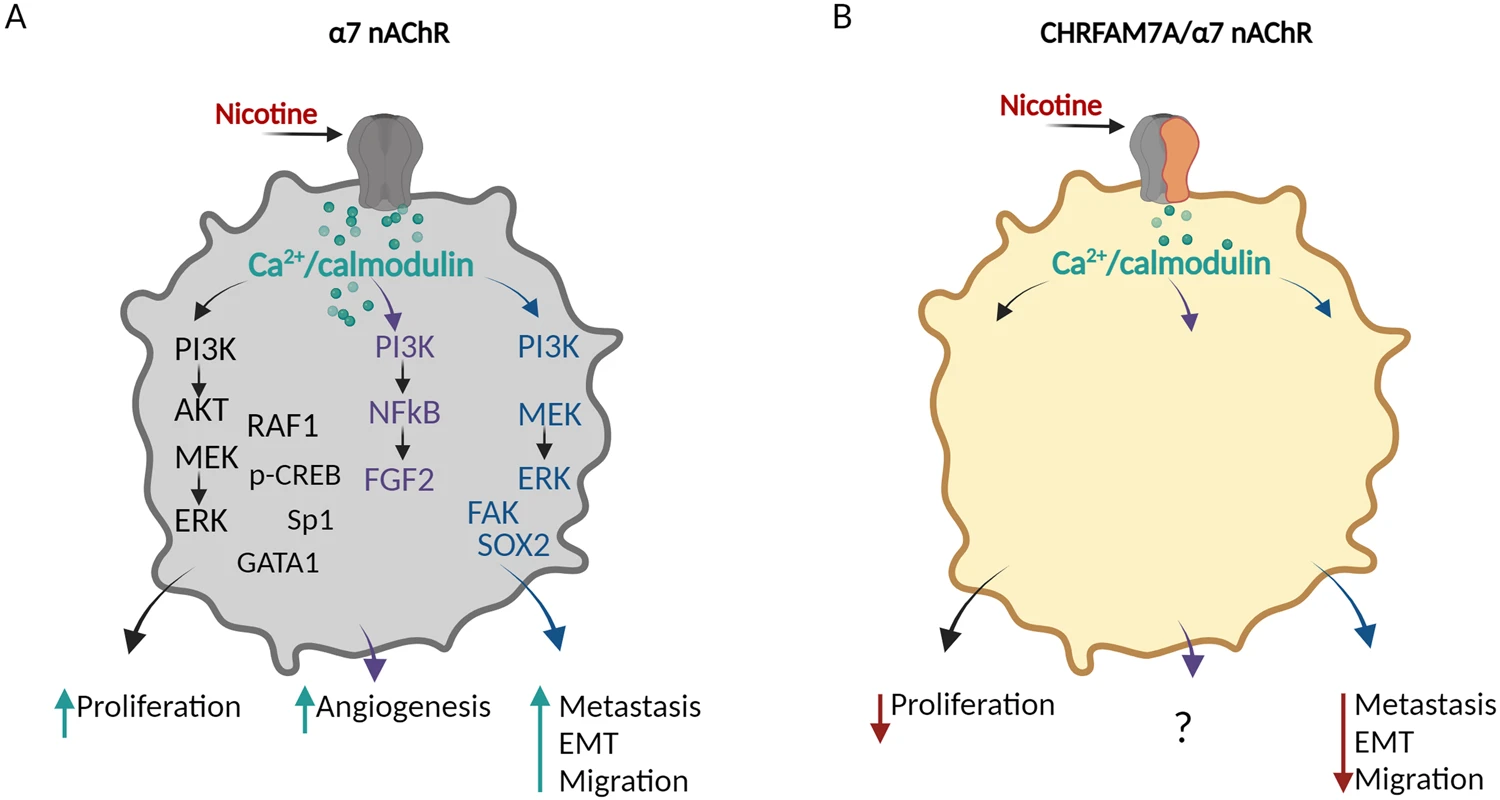
Fig.4 Role of alpha-7 nicotinic receptor in cancer comparison to CHRFAM7A protein subunit.

The presence of the direct allele can reduce therapeutic response to acetylcholine inhibitors because of its hypomorphism. CHRFAM7A is expressed rapidly in human leukocytes and regulated immune response through modulation of NF-κB activation and translocation. This leads to the release of inflammatory cytokines including IL-6, IL-1ß, and TNF-ɑ.

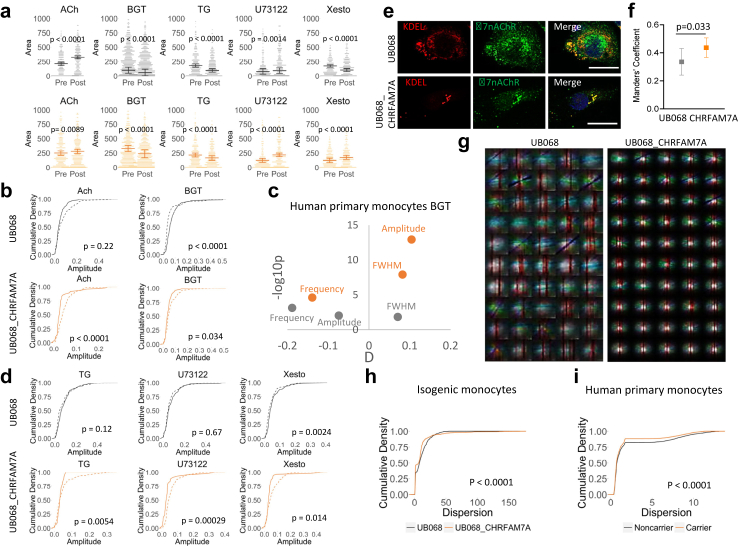
Fig.5 Characterization of the α7/CHRFAM7A nAChR

CHRFAM7A effects neuronal structure through actin cytoskeleton reorganization by acting as an upstream regulator of Rac1. This promotes the shift from filopodia to lamellipodia membrane structures affecting cell bodies, growth cone, and dendritic spines which may lead to an increase in brain efficiency and neuron connection. It has also been shown to lessen amyloid beta uptake reducing neurotoxicity in humans.

== Family ==
CHRFAM7A is a member of the nicotinic acetylcholine receptor family. The nicotinic acetylcholine receptors belong to a superfamily of ligand gated ion channels also known as the cys-loop receptor superfamily. Other members of this superfamily include GABA A, GABA C, glycinergic receptors, and serotonin receptors.

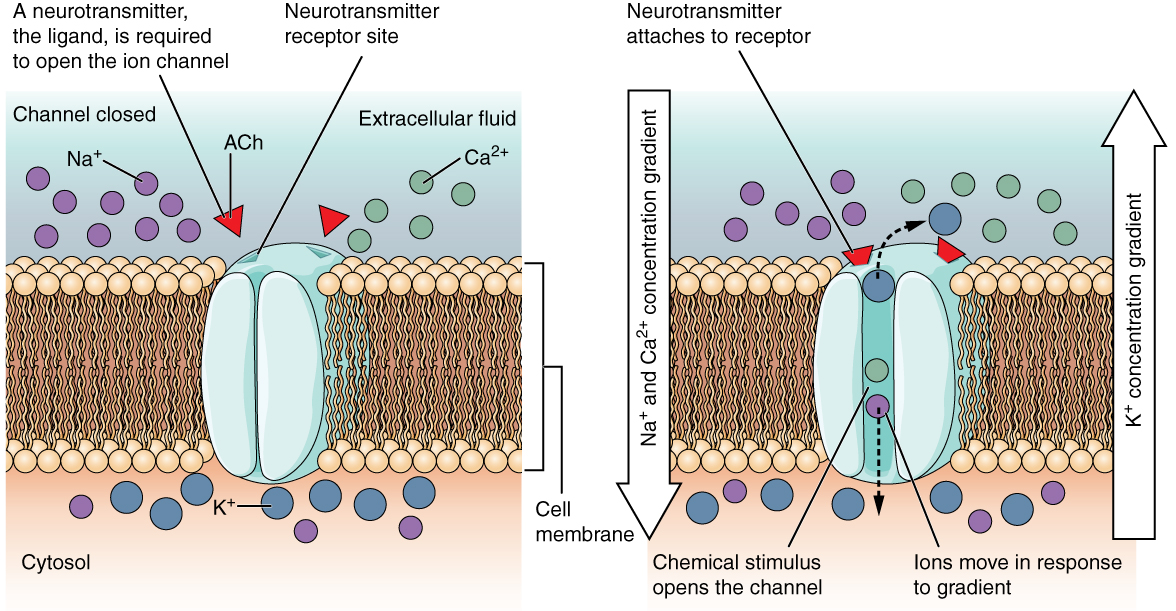
Fig.2 Example of Ligand Gated Channel

Since CHRFAM7A is a human specific gene its family origins are complex. As a fusion gene, it is also linked to the ULK4 gene family and GOLGA8B. The FAM7A ULK4 gene component of CHRFMA7A encodes for serine and threonine kinase involved in neuronal process such as neuritogenesis and cellular motility. The FAM7A GOLGA8B component of CHRFAM7A is linked to the golgin family of proteins which is associated with the Golgi apparatus. The CHRNA7 gene which CHRFAM7A is derived from is one of the oldest members of the cys-loop receptor family and has stayed similar across many species.

== Clinical significance ==
CHRFAM7A is absent in standard preclinical models such as rodents causing a translation gap in drugs targeting the ɑ7 nicotinic acetylcholine receptor. The translation gap is also influenced by the presence of direct alleles that produce a hypomorphic receptor. These factors are not usually accounted for in preclinical screenings, it has been suggested that failed clinical trials should be reproduced so models carry CHRFAM7A and can model human drug responses.

CHRFAM7A also plays a role in pharmacogenetics. The presence of the direct allele has been shown to reduce therapeutic treatment such as acetylcholine inhibitors. The direct allele also reduces neuronal uptake of amyloid beta which can be protective during early stages of Alzheimer's disease. The △2bp polymorphism in exon 6 has been linked as a risk factor for P50 auditory sensory gating deficits which is also linked to schizophrenia.

CHRFAM7A is present in inflammatory and immune related conditions. In patients with sepsis, a high CHRFAM7A to CHRNA7 ratio in their blood is associated with poor clinical outcomes and increased mortality rates. In contrast, reduced expression is associated with elevated levels of inflammation and condition severity in COVID-19. In spinal cord injuries, the presence of △2bp is associated with increased inflammatory cytokine levels and higher neuropathic pain. In cell lung carcinomas, the gene acts as a protective factor by reducing nicotine induced cell proliferation and inhibits tumor progression.

In healthy individuals, CHRFAM7A has been linked to brain efficiency and cognitive performance. Neuroimaging suggest carriers have smaller whole brain volumes but have higher cognitive function.

== Research ==
While we do not know the exact date of when CHRFAM7A appeared in the human lineage we can assume that it appeared approximately 3.5 million years ago after humans evolved from chimpanzees due to it being a human specific gene. CHRFAM7A was first identified through studies of the CHRNA7 gene on chromosome 15. In 1998, Gault et al. discovered that the CHRNA7 gene undergoes a partial duplication. This partial duplication was later shown to create CHRFAM7A.

=== Early 2000s ===
Later in 2002, Riley et al. confirmed that exons 5-10 of CHRNA7 fuse with a cluster of exons on the FAM7A cassette. It was later found that four of these exons, A,B,C, and E originated from the ULK4 gene on chromosome 3. Confirming CHRFAM7A as a human specific fusion gene since this recombination has yet to be found in other species.

In 2003, Gault et al. identified a two base pair deletion △2bp in exon 6. By 2008, Flomen et al. discovered that this deletion is associated with a genomic inversion that creates two different versions of CHRFAM7A in humans one known as the direct orientation and the other known as the inverted orientation.

=== 2010-now ===
In 2011, Araud et al. and de Lucas-Cerrilo et al. provided evidence that dupɑ7 combines with ɑ7 nicotinic acetylcholine receptor and acts as a negative regulator. Later in 2014 & 2018, Wang et al. and Lasala et al. exhibited that the combination of subunits formed truncated heteromeric receptors known as heteropentameric receptors or heteropentamers.

CHRFAM7A research has also been connected to human disease. In the early 2000s, studies identified strong links between the 15q13.3 locus and schizophrenia. This led to Szigeti et al.'s research in 2020 that discovered carriers and noncarriers of CHRFAM7A respond differently to therapeutic treatment.
