= Gemlapodect =

Clinical data
- Other names: NOE-105; NOE105
- Routes of administration: Oral
- Drug class: Phosphodiesterase PDE10A inhibitor

Identifiers
- IUPAC name: 1-methyl-4-(morpholine-4-carbonyl)-N-(2-phenyl-[1,2,4]triazolo[1,5-a]pyridin-7-yl)pyrazole-5-carboxamide
- CAS Number: 1380329-87-2
- PubChem CID: 57377410
- DrugBank: DB18769
- UNII: RF3JGD64ZU
- KEGG: D13073
- ChEMBL: ChEMBL5314465

Chemical and physical data
- Formula: C_{22}H_{21}N_{7}O_{3}
- Molar mass: 431.456 g·mol^{−1}
- 3D model (JSmol): Interactive image
- SMILES: CN1C(=C(C=N1)C(=O)N2CCOCC2)C(=O)NC3=CC4=NC(=NN4C=C3)C5=CC=CC=C5
- InChI: InChI=1S/C22H21N7O3/c1-27-19(17(14-23-27)22(31)28-9-11-32-12-10-28)21(30)24-16-7-8-29-18(13-16)25-20(26-29)15-5-3-2-4-6-15/h2-8,13-14H,9-12H2,1H3,(H,24,30); Key:MMCSMWHWVGGCGL-UHFFFAOYSA-N

Gemlapodect (INN, USAN; developmental code name NOE-105) is a phosphodiesterase PDE10A inhibitor which is under development for the treatment of Tourette's syndrome and speech disorders. It is taken orally. The drug is thought to work by modulating dopaminergic signaling in the striatum through PDE10A inhibition in medium spiny neurons. Gemlapodect was originated by Roche and is under development by Noema Pharma. As of September 2025, it is in phase 2 clinical trials for both Tourette's syndrome and speech disorders.

== See also ==
- List of investigational Tourette's syndrome drugs
