= Papaveretum =

Chemical compound

Combination of
- Morphine: Opioid analgesic
- Papaverine: Antispasmodic
- Codeine: Opioid analgesic

Clinical data
- Trade names: Omnopon
- ATC code: N02AA10 (WHO)

Identifiers
- CAS Number: 8002-76-4
- PubChem CID: 24840907

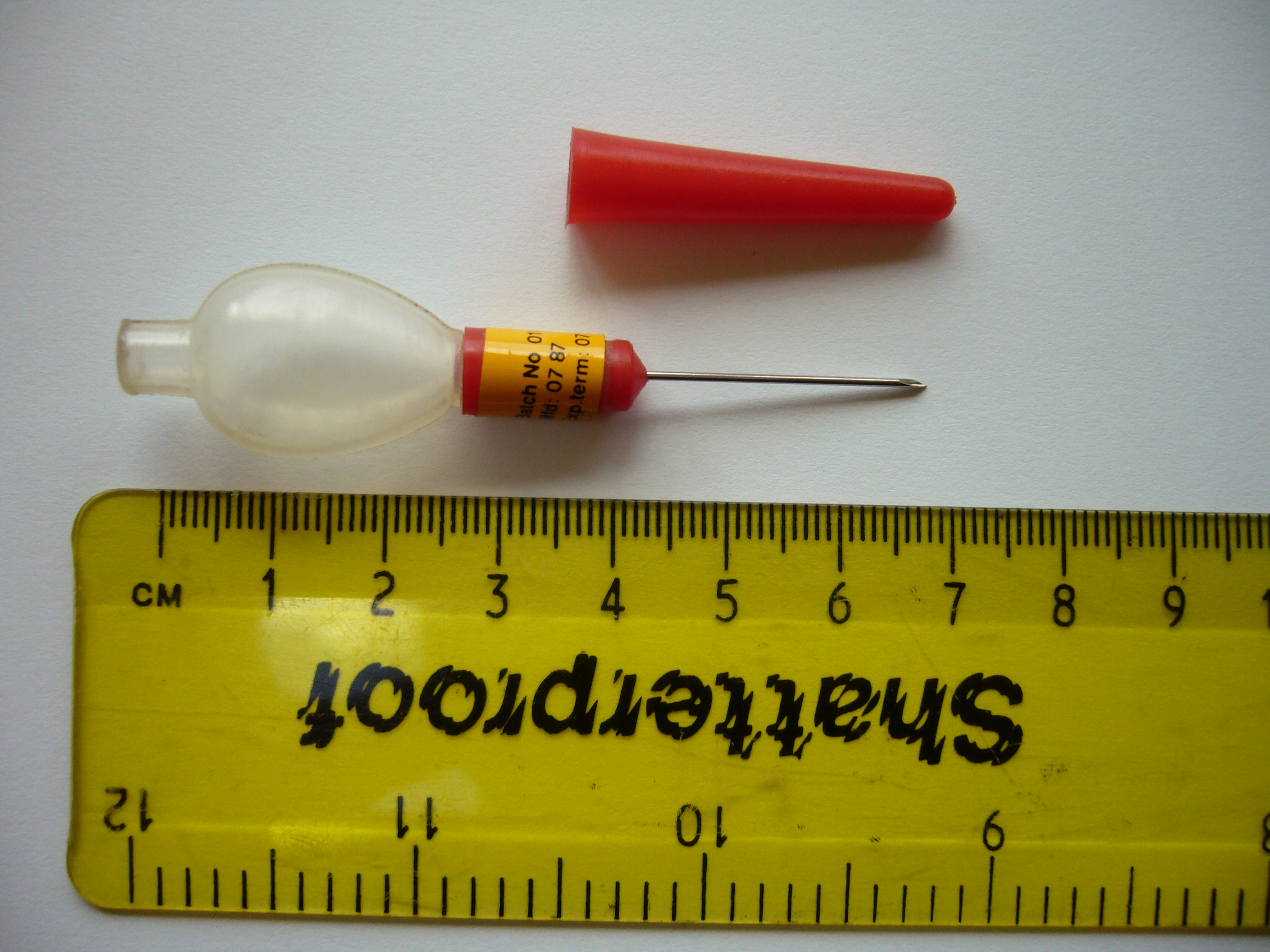
British syrette from combat medical kit containing Omnopon. Circa 1990s

Papaveretum (BAN) is a preparation containing a mixture of hydrochloride salts of opium alkaloids. Since 1993, papaveretum has been defined in the British Pharmacopoeia (BP) as a mixture of 253 parts morphine hydrochloride, 23 parts papaverine hydrochloride, and 20 parts codeine hydrochloride. It is commonly marketed to medical agencies under the trade name Omnopon.

Although the use of papaveretum is now relatively uncommon following the wide availability of single-component opiates and synthetic opioids (e.g. pethidine), it is still used to relieve moderate to severe pain and for pre-operative sedation. In clinical settings, papaveretum is usually administered to patients via subcutaneous, intramuscular, or intravenous routes. Additionally, the morphine syrettes found in combat medical kits issued to military personnel actually contain Omnopon.

Prior to 1993, papaveretum also contained noscapine, though this component was removed from the BP formulation due to the genotoxic potential of noscapine.
