= Mardepodect =

Drug formerly in development

Clinical data
- Other names: PF-2545920
- ATC code: None

Legal status
- Legal status: Investigational

Identifiers
- IUPAC name: 2-(4-(1-Methyl-4-pyridin-4-yl-1H-pyrazol-3-yl)phenoxymethyl)quinoline
- CAS Number: 898562-94-2
- PubChem CID: 11581936
- DrugBank: DB08387
- ChemSpider: 9756702
- UNII: R9Y8EY0G42
- KEGG: D11171
- ChEMBL: ChEMBL1642569
- CompTox Dashboard (EPA): DTXSID001025873

Chemical and physical data
- Formula: C_{25}H_{20}N_{4}O
- Molar mass: 392.462 g·mol^{−1}
- 3D model (JSmol): Interactive image
- SMILES: n3c1ccccc1ccc3COc5ccc(cc5)-c2nn(C)cc2-c4ccncc4
- InChI: InChI=1S/C25H20N4O/c1-29-16-23(18-12-14-26-15-13-18)25(28-29)20-7-10-22(11-8-20)30-17-21-9-6-19-4-2-3-5-24(19)27-21/h2-16H,17H2,1H3; Key:AZEXWHKOMMASPA-UHFFFAOYSA-N

Mardepodect (developmental code name PF-2545920) is a drug which was developed by Pfizer for the treatment of schizophrenia. It acts as a phosphodiesterase inhibitor selective for the PDE_{10A} subtype.

The PDE_{10A} enzyme is expressed primarily in the brain, mostly in the striatum, nucleus accumbens and olfactory tubercle, and is thought to be particularly important in regulating the activity of dopamine-sensitive medium spiny neurons in the striatum which are known to be targets of conventional antipsychotic drugs. Older PDE_{10A} inhibitors such as papaverine have been shown to produce antipsychotic effects in animal models, and more potent and selective PDE_{10A} inhibitors are a current area of research for novel antipsychotic drugs which act through a different pathway to conventional dopamine or 5-HT_{2A} antagonist drugs and may have a more favourable side effects profile.

Mardepodect is currently one of the furthest advanced PDE_{10A} inhibitors in development and has progressed through to Phase II clinical trials in humans. In 2017, development of mardepodect for the treatment of schizophrenia and Huntington's disease was discontinued.

== See also ==
- List of investigational antipsychotics
- Balipodect
- MK-8189
