= MK-8189 =

Chemical compound

Legal status
- Legal status: Investigational

Identifiers
- IUPAC name: 2-Methyl-6-[[(1S,2S)-2-(5-methylpyridin-2-yl)cyclopropyl]methoxy]-N-[(5-methyl-1,3,4-thiadiazol-2-yl)methyl]pyrimidin-4-amine
- CAS Number: 1424371-93-6
- PubChem CID: 71271414
- ChemSpider: 128922007
- UNII: 7M430JI73B

Chemical and physical data
- Formula: C_{19}H_{22}N_{6}OS
- Molar mass: 382.49 g·mol^{−1}
- 3D model (JSmol): Interactive image
- SMILES: CC1=CN=C(C=C1)[C@H]2C[C@@H]2COC3=NC(=NC(=C3)NCC4=NN=C(S4)C)C
- InChI: InChI=1S/C19H22N6OS/c1-11-4-5-16(20-8-11)15-6-14(15)10-26-18-7-17(22-12(2)23-18)21-9-19-25-24-13(3)27-19/h4-5,7-8,14-15H,6,9-10H2,1-3H3,(H,21,22,23)/t14-,15+/m1/s1; Key:WQKPZDLZRFTMTI-CABCVRRESA-N

MK-8189 is a selective phosphodiesterase 10A inhibitor being developed for schizophrenia. It is developed by Merck in collaboration with Royalty Pharma.

== See also ==
- List of investigational antipsychotics
- List of investigational bipolar disorder drugs
- Balipodect
- Mardepodect
