= Sultiame =

Chemical compound

- Molecular structure of sulthiame

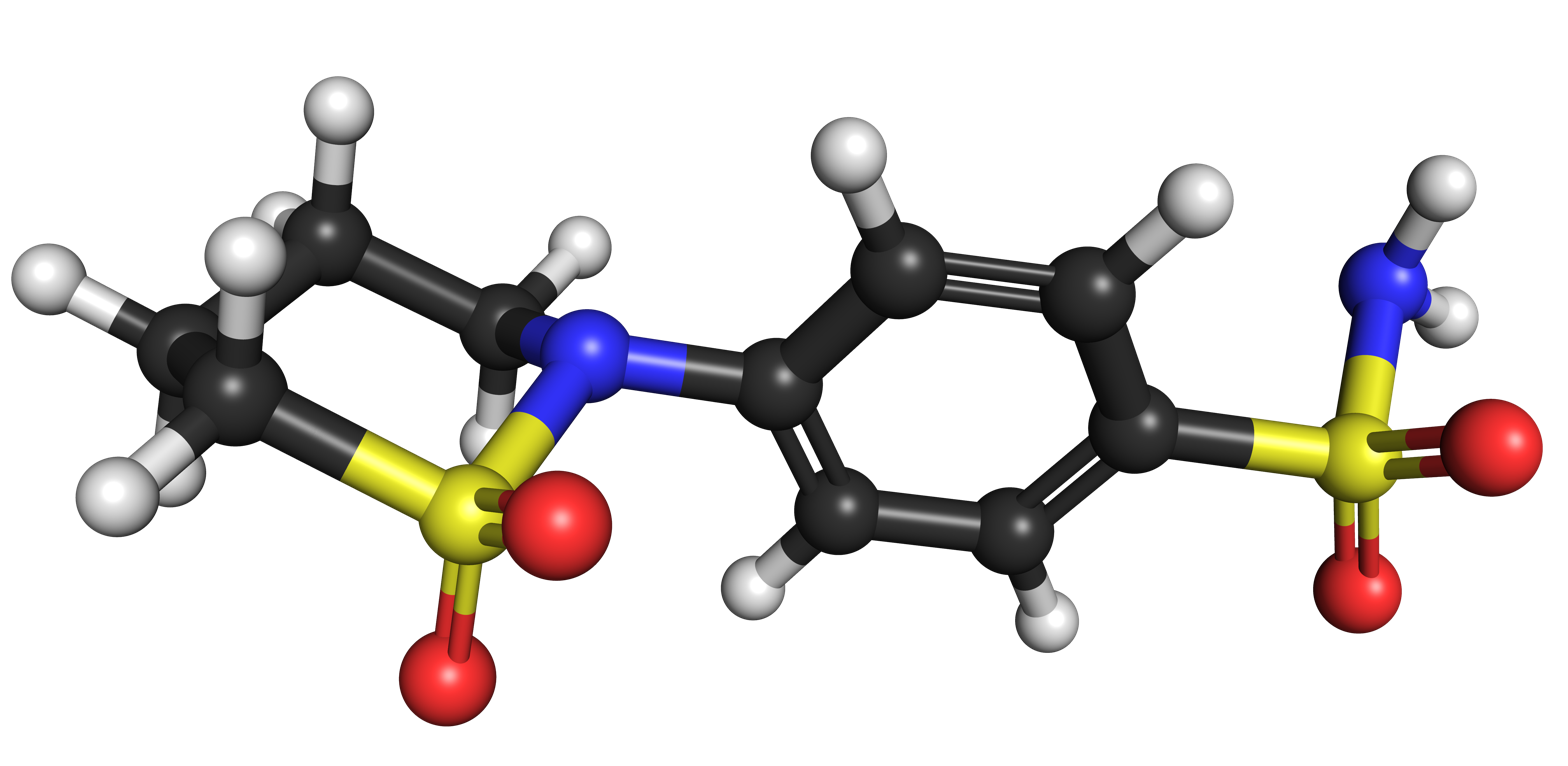
- 3D representation of a sulthiame molecule

Clinical data
- Trade names: Ospolot
- Other names: Sulthiame, Sulthiame (AAN AU), sulthiame (USAN US)
- AHFS/Drugs.com: International Drug Names
- Pregnancy category: AU: D
- Routes of administration: Oral
- Drug class: Anticonvulsant; Carbonic anhydrase inhibitor
- ATC code: N03AX03 (WHO)

Legal status
- Legal status: AU: S4 (Prescription only); UK: POM (Prescription only); US: ℞-only

Pharmacokinetic data
- Bioavailability: 100% (oral)
- Protein binding: 29%
- Metabolism: Hepatic secretion
- Elimination half-life: 24 hours
- Excretion: Fecal (10%) and renal (90%)

Identifiers
- IUPAC name: 4-(1,1-dioxothiazinan-2-yl)benzenesulfonamide
- CAS Number: 61-56-3
- PubChem CID: 5356
- DrugBank: DB08329
- ChemSpider: 5163
- UNII: I00Q766CZ2
- KEGG: D01787
- ChEMBL: ChEMBL328560
- CompTox Dashboard (EPA): DTXSID4023626
- ECHA InfoCard: 100.000.465

Chemical and physical data
- Formula: C_{10}H_{14}N_{2}O_{4}S_{2}
- Molar mass: 290.35 g·mol^{−1}
- 3D model (JSmol): Interactive image
- SMILES: O=S2(=O)N(c1ccc(cc1)S(=O)(=O)N)CCCC2
- InChI: InChI=1S/C10H14N2O4S2/c11-18(15,16)10-5-3-9(4-6-10)12-7-1-2-8-17(12,13)14/h3-6H,1-2,7-8H2,(H2,11,15,16); Key:HMHVCUVYZFYAJI-UHFFFAOYSA-N

Sultiame, or sulthiame, sold under the brand name Ospolot among others, is a sulfonamide and inhibitor of the enzyme carbonic anhydrase which is used as an anticonvulsant in the treatment of epilepsy. In addition to its use as an antiepileptic medication, recent studies showed promise in reducing sleep disordered breathing and other symptoms of obstructive sleep apnea (OSA).

== Medical uses ==
Historically, sultiame has been used to treat partial seizures. In Australia, it is currently registered for behavioural disorders associated with epilepsy; hyperkinetic behaviour; temporal lobe epilepsy; myoclonic seizures; grand mal attacks; and Jacksonian seizures. In contrast to other sulfonamide drugs, sultiame is devoid of antibacterial activity.

== Adverse effects ==
The more common adverse effects are ataxia, paraesthesia of face and limbs, hyperpnoea, dyspnoea, and anorexia. Less common adverse effects include giddiness, rash, Stevens–Johnson syndrome, nausea, weight loss, leukopenia, headache, depression, drooling, increased pain, insomnia, and status epilepticus. Disturbances in calcium and vitamin D metabolism have been occasionally reported after long-term use.

== Overdose ==
In overdose, vomiting, hypotension, headache, vertigo, ataxia, metabolic acidosis with hyperpnoea, and catatonic state may occur. There is no specific antidote. It is not known whether dialysis may help in case of overdose.

== Interactions ==
Sultiame taken together with primidone may lead to severe side effects, including psychotic reactions. The addition of sulthiame to phenytoin therapy has shown to be followed by a rise in the serum levels of phenytoin. Sultiame may also lead to a rise of phenobarbitone blood levels. Alcohol must not be consumed during treatment.

== Chemistry ==
=== Synthesis ===
Review of synthesis (modern methods):

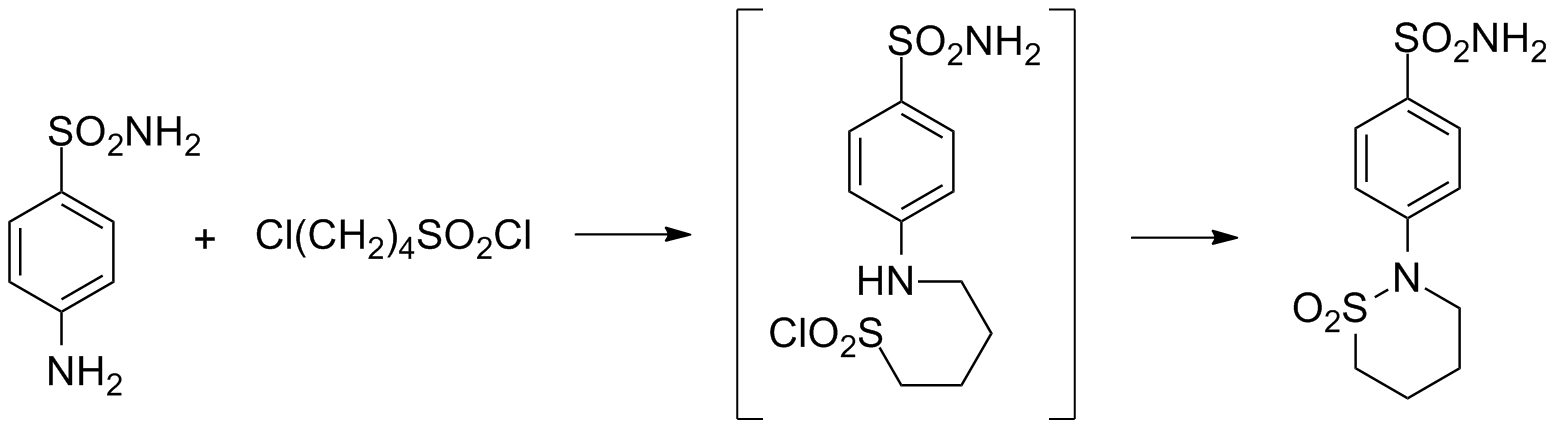
Sultiame synthesis: B. Helferich and R. Behnisch, U.S. patent 2,916,489 (1959).

Sulfanilamide can be reacted with ω-chlorobutylsulfonyl chloride and aqueous sodium carbonate to form the presumed intermediate (middle), which spontaneously cyclizes to give the drug.

== History ==
Sultiame was first synthesised in the laboratories of Bayer AG in the mid-1950s and eventually launched as Ospolot in Europe and other markets the early 1960s. It never became a registered drug in the United States. The brand was transferred to Desitin GmbH in 1993 and is sold in several European countries, in Israel, Japan, and Australia.

Sultiame became established as a second-line drug for treatment of partial epilepsy in the 1960s and 1970s and was often used in combination with the established anticonvulsant phenytoin. Temporal lobe seizures appeared particularly responsive to sultiame. Doubts subsequently arose as to whether sultiame has intrinsic anticonvulsant properties. After discovering sultiame's ability to raise the blood levels of phenytoin, it was assumed that sultiame would only act in combination with phenytoin. This finding, together with the equivocal results of a study in the US, resulted in a quick decline of sultiame's use. It was only in 1988, that the German child neurologist Hermann Doose discovered its specific effects in benign focal epilepsies of childhood. Today, sulthiame is the drug of choice for benign focal epilepsies of childhood (such as benign rolandic epilepsy) in the German-speaking countries and Israel.

== Society and culture ==
=== Availability ===
Sultiame is marketed and available in Europe, Israel, Japan, and Australia. European countries in which sultiame is or has been available include the Austria, Czech Republic, Germany, Greece, Hungary, Switzerland, and the United Kingdom. Conversely, it has never been registered in the United States.

== Research ==
Sultiame is being studied for the treatment of obstructive sleep apnea (OSA), with encouraging preliminary findings.

== See also ==
- List of investigational sleep apnea drugs
