= Palmitoylethanolamide =

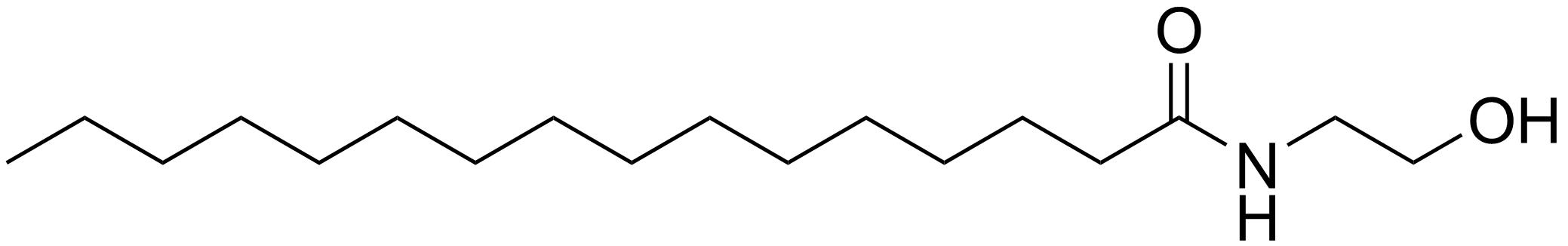
- Skeletal formula of palmitoylethanolamide

Names
- Preferred IUPAC name N-(2-Hydroxyethyl)hexadecanamide
- Other names: Hydroxyethylpalmitamide; Palmidrol; N-Palmitoylethanolamine; Palmitylethanolamide

Identifiers
CAS Number	544-31-0
3D model (JSmol)	Interactive image
Abbreviations	PEA
ChEMBL	ChEMBL417675
ChemSpider	4509
ECHA InfoCard	100.008.062
EC Number	208-867-9
KEGG	D08328
MeSH	palmidrol
PubChem CID	4671
UNII	6R8T1UDM3V
CompTox Dashboard (EPA)	DTXSID4042254
- InChI: InChI=1S/C18H37NO2/c1-2-3-4-5-6-7-8-9-10-11-12-13-14-15-18(21)19-16-17-20/h20H,2-17H2,1H3,(H,19,21) Key: HXYVTAGFYLMHSO-UHFFFAOYSA-N
- SMILES: CCCCCCCCCCCCCCCC(=O)NCCO

Properties
Chemical formula	C_{18}H_{37}NO_{2}
Molar mass	299.499 g·mol^{−1}
Appearance	White crystals
Density	910 mg mL^{−1}
Melting point	93 to 98 °C (199 to 208 °F; 366 to 371 K)
log P	5.796

Hazards
Flash point	323.9 °C (615.0 °F; 597.0 K)

Related compounds
Related compounds	Hypusine; Saccharopine
- Except where otherwise noted, data are given for materials in their standard state (at 25 °C [77 °F], 100 kPa). verify (what is ?) Infobox references

Palmitoylethanolamide (PEA), also known as palmidrol (INN), is an endogenous fatty acid amide, and lipid modulator.

PEA is not a classic endocannabinoid because it lacks affinity for the cannabinoid receptors CB1 and CB2.

== Metabolism ==
PEA is metabolized by the cellular enzymes fatty acid amide hydrolase (FAAH) and N-acylethanolamine acid amide hydrolase (NAAA), the latter of which has more specificity toward PEA over other fatty acid amides.

== Safety ==
PEA is generally considered safe, and without adverse drug reactions (ADRs) or drug interactions. A 2016 meta‐analysis of PEA as an analgesic concluded that for treatment periods up to 49 days, there were no serious ADRs at an incidence of 1/200 or greater. Another meta-analysis found that no serious ADRs occurred.

== See also ==
- Dronabinol/palmidrol
- N-Acylethanolamine
- N-Acylphosphatidylethanolamine
