= GOLGA8B =

Protein-coding gene in the species Homo sapiens

Identifiers
- Aliases: GOLGA8B, golgin A8 family member B, GOLGA5
- External IDs: OMIM: 609619; HomoloGene: 121673; GeneCards: GOLGA8B; OMA:GOLGA8B - orthologs

Gene location (Human)
Chr.	Chromosome 15 (human)
Band	15q14	Start	34,525,095 bp
Band	15q14	End	34,588,503 bp
RNA expression pattern
Bgee	Human / Mouse (ortholog); Top expressed in: body of pancreas; left lobe of thyroid gland; right lobe of thyroid gland; right uterine tube; right hemisphere of cerebellum; left ovary; right ovary; pituitary gland; anterior pituitary; sural nerve / n/a; More reference expression data
BioGPS	n/a
Orthologs
Species	Human	Mouse
Entrez	440270	n/a
Ensembl	ENSG00000215252	n/a
UniProt	A8MQT2	n/a
RefSeq (mRNA)	NM_001023567	n/a
RefSeq (protein)	NP_001018861	n/a
Location (UCSC)	Chr 15: 34.53 – 34.59 Mb	n/a
PubMed search		n/a
- Wikidata
View/Edit Human

Golgin A8 family member B is a protein that in humans is encoded by the GOLGA8B gene.
