= PDE10A =

Enzyme and protein-coding gene in humans

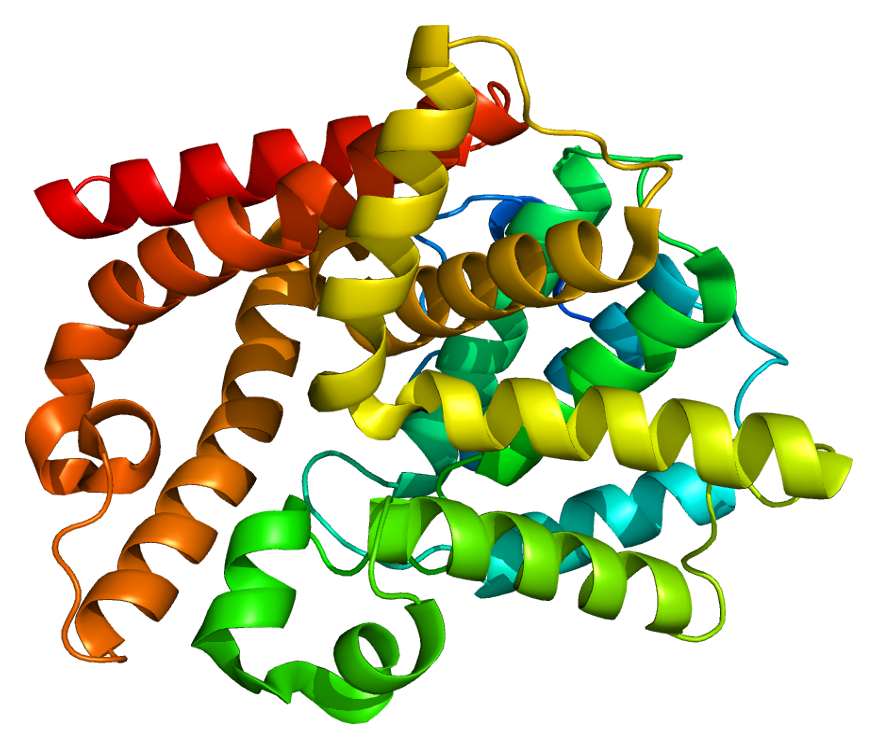
Available structures
PDB	Ortholog search: PDBe RCSB
PDB	List of PDB id codes 2OUN, 2OUP, 2OUQ, 2OUR, 2OUS, 2OUU, 2OUV, 2OUY, 2WEY, 2Y0J, 2ZMF, 3SN7, 3SNI, 3SNL, 3UI7, 3UUO, 3WI2, 3WS8, 3WS9, 3WYK, 3WYL, 3WYM, 4AEL, 4AJD, 4AJF, 4AJG, 4AJM, 4BBX, 4DDL, 4DFF, 4FCB, 4FCD, 4HEU, 4HF4, 4LKQ, 4LLJ, 4LLK, 4LLP, 4LLX, 4LM0, 4LM1, 4LM2, 4LM3, 4LM4, 4MRW, 4MRZ, 4MS0, 4MSA, 4MSC, 4MSE, 4MSH, 4MSN, 4MUW, 4MVH, 4P0N, 4P1R, 4PHW, 4TPM, 4TPP, 4WN1, 4XY2, 4YQH, 4YS7, 4ZO5, 5C1W, 5C28, 5C29, 5C2A, 5C2H, 5DH5, 5AXQ, 5DH4, 5AXP, 5C2E, 5EDH, 5EDI, 5EDG, 5EDE, 5I2R, 5B4L, 5B4K

Identifiers
- Aliases: PDE10A, HSPDE10A19, ADSD2, IOLOD, phosphodiesterase 10A, LINC00473
- External IDs: OMIM: 610652; MGI: 1345143; HomoloGene: 4852; GeneCards: PDE10A; OMA:PDE10A - orthologs

Gene location (Human)
Chr.	Chromosome 6 (human)
Band	6q27	Start	165,327,287 bp
Band	6q27	End	165,988,117 bp

Gene location (Mouse)
Chr.	Chromosome 17 (mouse)
Band	17|17 A1	Start	8,744,204 bp
Band	17|17 A1	End	9,205,480 bp
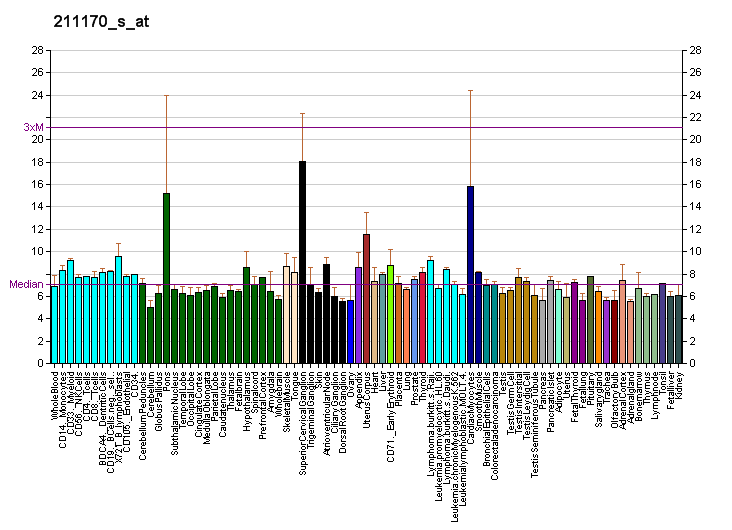

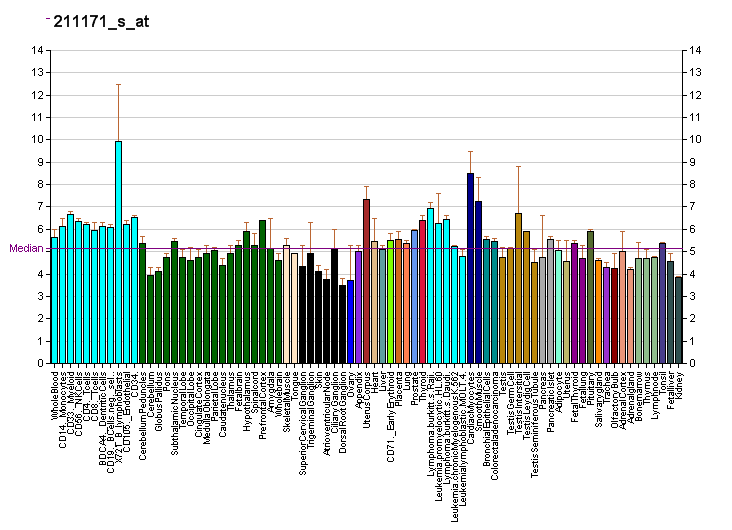

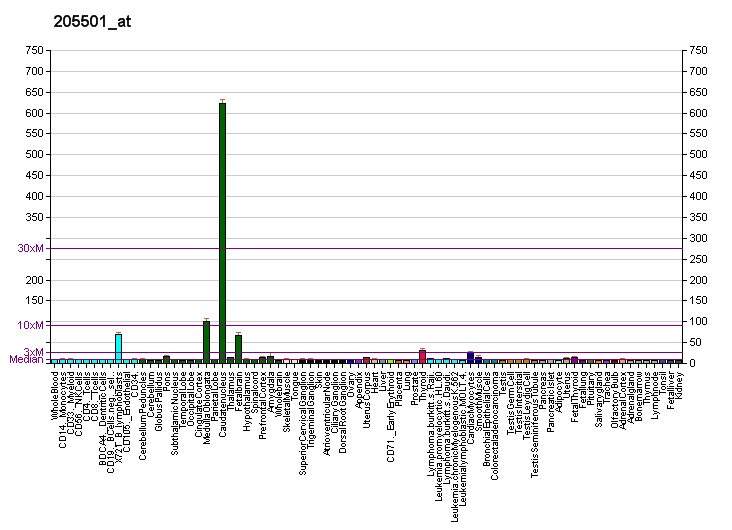
RNA expression pattern
Bgee	Human / Mouse (ortholog); Top expressed in: left uterine tube; cartilage tissue; left ovary; external globus pallidus; corpus epididymis; putamen; right ovary; anterior pituitary; stromal cell of endometrium; caudate nucleus / Top expressed in: olfactory tubercle; nucleus accumbens; globus pallidus; superior frontal gyrus; temporal lobe; amygdala; lobe of cerebellum; cerebellar vermis; anterior amygdaloid area; lateral septal nucleus; More reference expression data
BioGPS	More reference expression data
Gene ontology
Molecular function	nucleotide binding; 3',5'-cyclic-nucleotide phosphodiesterase activity; cAMP binding; cGMP binding; metal ion binding; cGMP-stimulated cyclic-nucleotide phosphodiesterase activity; cyclic-nucleotide phosphodiesterase activity; catalytic activity; phosphoric diester hydrolase activity; hydrolase activity; 3',5'-cyclic-AMP phosphodiesterase activity; 3',5'-cyclic-GMP phosphodiesterase activity
Cellular component	cytoplasm; cytosol; perikaryon; membrane; soma
Biological process	cAMP catabolic process; regulation of protein kinase A signaling; cGMP catabolic process; regulation of cAMP-mediated signaling; metabolism; signal transduction; G protein-coupled receptor signaling pathway; negative regulation of cGMP-mediated signaling; negative regulation of cAMP-mediated signaling
Sources:Amigo / QuickGO
Orthologs
Species	Human	Mouse
Entrez	10846	23984
Ensembl	ENSG00000112541	ENSMUSG00000023868
UniProt	Q9Y233	Q8CA95
RefSeq (mRNA)	NM_001130690; NM_006661; NM_001385079	NM_001290707; NM_011866; NM_001347321
RefSeq (protein)	NP_001124162; NP_006652	NP_001277636; NP_001334250; NP_035996
Location (UCSC)	Chr 6: 165.33 – 165.99 Mb	Chr 17: 8.74 – 9.21 Mb
PubMed search
- Wikidata
View/Edit Human	View/Edit Mouse

cAMP and cAMP-inhibited cGMP 3',5'-cyclic phosphodiesterase 10A is an enzyme that in humans is encoded by the PDE10A gene.

Various cellular responses are regulated by the second messengers cAMP and cGMP. Phosphodiesterases, such as PDE10A, eliminate cAMP- and cGMP-mediated intracellular signaling by hydrolyzing the cyclic nucleotide to the corresponding nucleoside 5-prime monophosphate.

== Inhibitors ==
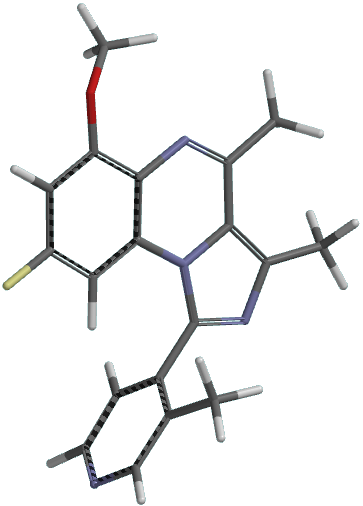
3d model of compound #96 (Malamas, 2011)

- AMG-579
- Balipodect (TAK-063): IC_{50} = 300 pM
- Compound 96: IC_{50} = 700 pM, high selectivity against all other members of the PDE family
- CPL500036
- Mardepodect (PF-2545920)
- MK-8189
- Papaverine
- Tofisopam
- CPL 36

== Research ==
Preliminary evidence indicates a possible link between PDE10A expression and obesity in mice and humans. PDE10A is a regulatory protein involved in the signaling of the striatum, a region of the brain important for controlling movement and cognition. Dysfunction of the striatum has been linked to the development of schizophrenia. Inhibition of PDE10A has been identified as a potential treatment for the disorder, and an inhibitor compound (MK-8189) is as of February 2023 in Phase 2b clinical development for the treatment of schizophrenia.
