= Latent inhibition =

Psychology term

Latent inhibition (LI) is a technical term in classical conditioning, where a familiar stimulus takes longer to acquire meaning (as a signal or conditioned stimulus) than a new stimulus. The term originated with Lubow and Moore in 1973. The LI effect is latent in that it is not exhibited in the stimulus pre-exposure phase, but rather in the subsequent test phase. "Inhibition", here, simply connotes that the effect is expressed in terms of relatively poor learning. The LI effect is extremely robust, appearing in both invertebrate (for example, honey bees) and mammalian species that have been tested and across many different learning paradigms, thereby suggesting some adaptive advantages, such as protecting the organism from associating irrelevant stimuli with other, more important, events.

== Theories ==
The LI effect has received a number of theoretical interpretations. One class of theory holds that inconsequential stimulus pre-exposure results in reduced associability for that stimulus. The loss of associability has been attributed to a variety of mechanisms that reduce attention, which then must be reacquired in order for learning to proceed normally. Alternatively, it has been proposed that LI is a result of retrieval failure rather than acquisition failure. Such a position advocates that, following stimulus pre-exposure, the acquisition of the new association to the old stimulus proceeds normally. However, in the test stage, two associations (the stimulus-no consequence association from the pre-exposure stage and the stimulus-consequence stimulus association of the acquisition stage) are retrieved and compete for expression. The group not pre-exposed to the stimulus performs better than the pre-exposed group because for the first group there is only the second association to be retrieved.

== Adaptive function ==
Latent inhibition is thought to be a form of adaptive learning strategy for animals. When an organism is initially exposed to a stimulus without any meaningful connection, it will learn that the stimulus is not of importance when predicting actual reliable outcomes. This results in the organism’s lack of a strong association when the stimulus appears with rewards or threats. Some researchers suggest that it helps reduce nonessential responses and helps preserve their limited attention span and memory resources in environments where many events could be occurring at once. In this perspective, latent inhibition can behave as a selective filter that increases efficiency for organisms by prioritizing more trustworthy predictions and ignoring certain unnecessary ones.

== Variation ==
LI is affected by many factors, one of the most important of which is context. In virtually all LI studies, the context remains the same in the stimulus pre-exposure and test phases. However, if context is changed from the pre-exposure to the test phase, then LI is severely attenuated. The context-dependency of LI plays major roles in all current theories of LI, and in particular to their applications to schizophrenia, where it has been proposed that relationship between the pre-exposed stimulus and the context breaks down; context no longer sets the occasion for the expression of the stimulus-no consequence association. Consequently, working-memory is inundated with experimentally familiar but phenomenally novel stimuli, each competing for the limited resources required for efficient information processing. This description fits well with the positive symptoms of schizophrenia, particularly high distractibility, and with research findings.

== Physiology ==
The assumption that the attentional process that produces LI in normal subjects is dysfunctional in people with schizophrenia has stimulated considerable research, with humans, as well as with rats and mice. There is much data that indicate that dopamine agonists and antagonists modulate LI in rats and in normal humans. Dopamine agonists, such as amphetamines, abolish LI whereas dopamine antagonists, such as haloperidol and other antipsychotic drugs, produce a super-LI effect. In addition, manipulations of putative dopamine pathways in the brain also have the expected effects on LI. Thus, hippocampal and septal lesions interfere with the development of LI, as do lesions in selective portions of the nucleus accumbens. With human subjects, there is evidence that acute, non-medicated people with schizophrenia show reduced LI compared to chronic, medicated schizophrenics and to healthy subjects, while there is no difference in the amount of LI in the latter two groups. Finally, symptomatically normal subjects who score high on self-report questionnaires that measure psychotic-proneness or schizotypality also exhibit reduced LI compared to those who score low on the scales.

In addition to LI illustrating a fundamental strategy for information processing and providing a useful tool for examining attentional dysfunctions in pathological groups, the LI procedure has been used to screen for drugs that can ameliorate schizophrenia symptoms of LI. LI has also been used to explain why certain therapies, such as alcohol aversion treatments, are not as effective as might be expected. However, LI procedures may be useful in counteracting some of the undesirable side-effects that frequently accompany radiation and chemo-therapies for cancer, for example food aversion. LI research also has suggested techniques that may be efficacious in the prophylactic treatment of certain fears and phobias. Of popular interest, several studies have attempted to relate LI to creativity.

In summary, the basic LI phenomenon represents some output of a selective attention process that results in learning to ignore irrelevant stimuli. It has become an important tool for understanding information processing in general, as well as attentional dysfunctions in schizophrenia, and it has implications for a variety of practical problems.

== Pathology ==
=== Low latent inhibition ===
Most people are able to ignore the constant stream of incoming stimuli, but this capability is reduced in those with low latent inhibition. Low latent inhibition seems to often correlate with distracted behaviors, and may resemble hyper-activity, hypomania, or attention deficit hyperactivity disorder (ADHD) in early decades of life. This distractedness can manifest itself as general inattentiveness, a tendency to switch subjects without warning in conversation, and other absentminded habits. Not all distractedness can be explained by low latent inhibition, and not all people with low LI lack attentiveness. It does mean, however, that the higher quantity of incoming information requires a mind capable of handling it. Most people with autism are thought to have especially low levels of latent inhibition. Depending on their intelligence and social skills, it can often lead to sensory overload.

More generally: those of above average intelligence are thought to be capable of processing this stream effectively, enabling their creativity and increasing their awareness of their surroundings. Those with average and less than average intelligence are less able to cope, and as a result are more likely to suffer from mental illness and sensory overload. Correspondingly, it is hypothesized that a low level of latent inhibition can cause psychosis, a high level of creative achievement, or both, as a function of the respective individual's intelligence.

High levels of the neurotransmitter dopamine (or its agonists) in the ventral tegmental area of the brain have been shown to decrease latent inhibition. Certain neurotransmitter dysfunctions involving glutamate, serotonin, and acetylcholine have also been implicated.

== See also ==
- Genius
- Highly sensitive person
- Salience (neuroscience)
- Conditioned avoidance response test
