= Tofisopam =

Anxiolytic medication

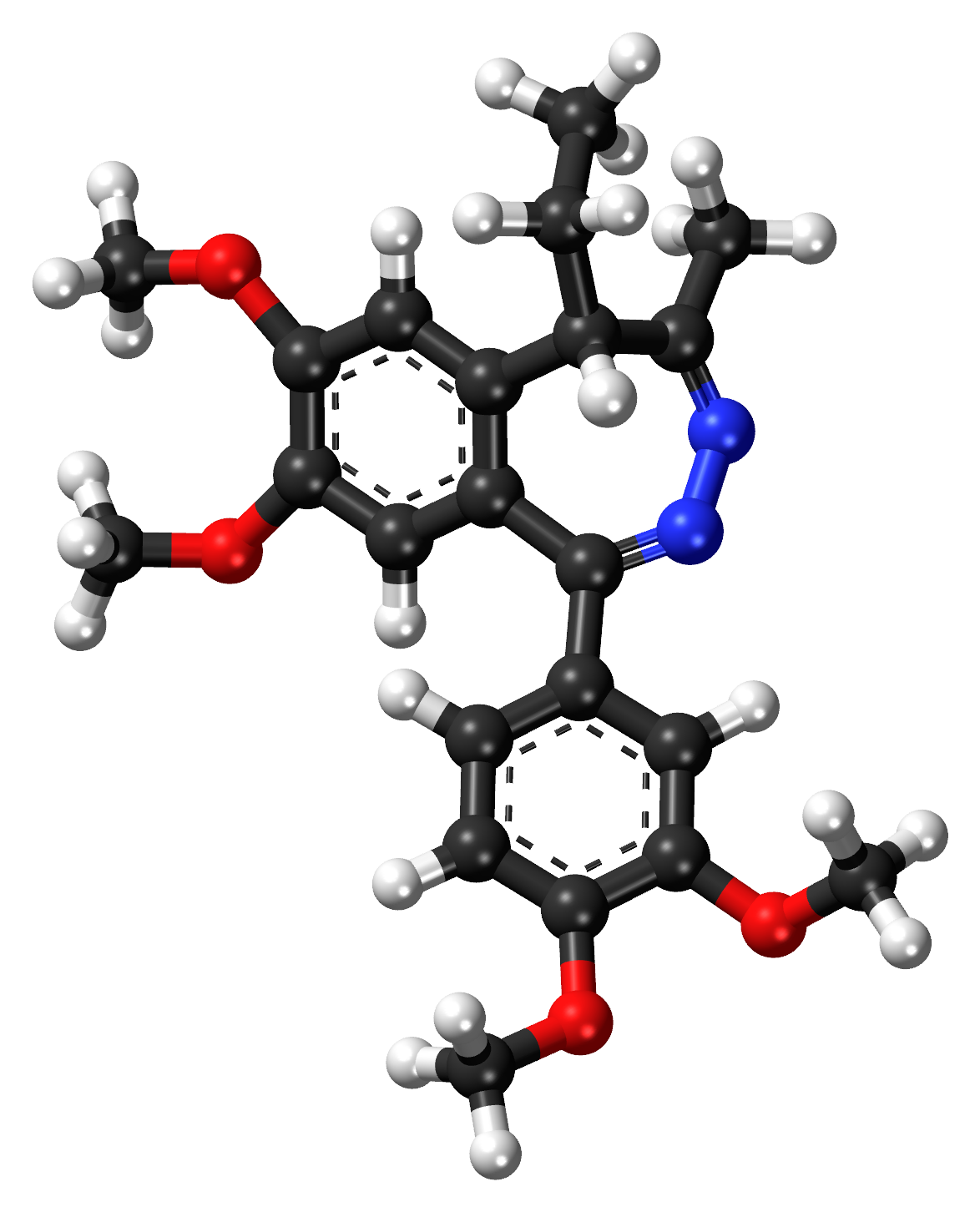

Clinical data
- Trade names: Endaxin
- Other names: 6-(3,4-Dimethoxyphenyl)-2-ethyl-9,10-dimethoxy-3-methyl-4,5-diazabicyclo[5.4.0]undeca-3,5,7,9,11-pentaene
- AHFS/Drugs.com: tofizopam International Drug Names
- Routes of administration: By mouth (tablets)
- ATC code: N05BA23 (WHO)

Legal status
- Legal status: In general: ℞ (Prescription only)

Pharmacokinetic data
- Metabolism: Hepatic
- Elimination half-life: 3 hours
- Excretion: Renal

Identifiers
- IUPAC name: 1-(3,4-dimethoxyphenyl)-5-ethyl-7,8-dimethoxy-4-methyl-5H-2,3-benzodiazepine
- CAS Number: 22345-47-7
- PubChem CID: 5502
- DrugBank: DB08811
- ChemSpider: 5301
- UNII: UZC80HAU42
- KEGG: D01254
- ChEMBL: ChEMBL404216
- CompTox Dashboard (EPA): DTXSID3023681
- ECHA InfoCard: 100.040.823

Chemical and physical data
- Formula: C_{22}H_{26}N_{2}O_{4}
- Molar mass: 382.460 g·mol^{−1}
- 3D model (JSmol): Interactive image
- SMILES: O(c3ccc(C\2=N\N=C(/C(c1c/2cc(OC)c(OC)c1)CC)C)cc3OC)C
- InChI: InChI=1S/C22H26N2O4/c1-7-15-13(2)23-24-22(14-8-9-18(25-3)19(10-14)26-4)17-12-21(28-6)20(27-5)11-16(15)17/h8-12,15H,7H2,1-6H3; Key:RUJBDQSFYCKFAA-UHFFFAOYSA-N

Tofisopam is chemically a 2,3-benzodiazepine marketed as an anxiolytic under trade names including Emandaxin and Grandaxin. Unlike other anxiolytic benzodiazepines, which are generally 1,4- or 1,5-substituted, tofisopam does not have anticonvulsant, sedative, skeletal muscle relaxant, motor skill-impairing or amnestic properties.

== Indications ==
It has been shown to enhance the anticonvulsant action of diazepam (a 1,4-benzodiazepine) and muscimol, but not of sodium valproate, carbamazepine, phenobarbital, or phenytoin.

Tofisopam is indicated for the treatment of anxiety and alcohol withdrawal, and is prescribed in a dosage of 50–300 mg per day divided into three doses. Peak plasma levels are attained two hours after an oral dose. Tofisopam is not reported as causing dependence to the same extent as other benzodiazepines, but is still recommended to be prescribed for a maximum of 12 weeks.

== Approval and use ==
Tofisopam is not approved for sale in the United States or Canada. However, Vela Pharmaceuticals of New Jersey is developing the D-enantiomer (dextofisopam) as a treatment for irritable bowel syndrome, with moderate efficacy demonstrated in clinical trials so far.

== Trade names ==
Tofisopam has been spelt alternatively as tofizopam and has been marketed and listed as "Grandaxin" in Hungary and other European countries, Pakistan, and Egypt. Japanese preparations include "Grandaxin 10%" and "Granpam". It has been marketed in India as "Nextril" and "Toficalm".

It is not approved in North America, including the U.S. and Canada, but it has appeared in United States patent literature and regulatory references. A U.S. patent concerning S-tofisopam was filed in 2001 and subsequently issued as U.S. Patent 6,649,607; the related patent record expired in November 2021US 7078398, "Compositions and methods for treating or preventing convulsions or seizures"

The patent describes S-tofisopam separately from the previously marketed racemic drug and does not constitute FDA approval of tofisopam as a human medicine in the United States.

Tofisopam has also appeared in Washington State's equine drug regulations. Washington State regulatory documents list the brand names "Grandaxain" and "Seriel". They also classify it as a Class 2 substance within equine medicine.

== Pharmacology ==
=== Pharmacodynamics ===
Tofisopam is also claimed to be a PDE_{10A} inhibitor, which may provide an alternative mechanism of action for its various therapeutic effects, and this action has been proposed to make tofisopam potentially useful as a treatment for schizophrenia.

=== Pharmacokinetics ===
Tofisopam has been shown to act as an inhibitor of the liver enzyme CYP3A4, and some researches suspect that this could cause dangerous drug interactions with other medications metabolised by this enzyme, although the clinical significance of these findings remains unclear.
