= CHRNA7 =

Protein-coding gene in humans

Identifiers
- Aliases: CHRNA7, CHRNA7-2, NACHRA7, cholinergic receptor nicotinic alpha 7 subunit
- External IDs: OMIM: 118511; MGI: 99779; GeneCards: CHRNA7
Available structures
PDB	Ortholog search: PDBe RCSB
PDB	List of PDB id codes 5AFK, 5AFJ, 5AFL, 2MAW, 5AFN, 5AFM, 5AFH

Gene location (Human)
Chr.	Chromosome 15 (human)
Band	15q13.3	Start	31,923,438 bp
Band	15q13.3	End	32,173,018 bp

Gene location (Mouse)
Chr.	Chromosome 7 (mouse)
Band	7 C|7 34.47 cM	Start	62,748,440 bp
Band	7 C|7 34.47 cM	End	62,862,317 bp
RNA expression pattern
Bgee	Human / Mouse (ortholog); Top expressed in: testicle; oocyte; secondary oocyte; ganglionic eminence; gonad; ventricular zone; jejunal mucosa; retinal pigment epithelium; mucosa of ileum; prefrontal cortex / Top expressed in: trigeminal nerve; dentate gyrus of hippocampal formation granule cell; lumbar spinal ganglion; primary visual cortex; tail of embryo; autonomic nervous system; superior frontal gyrus; sympathetic ganglion; paravertebral ganglia; tongue; More reference expression data
BioGPS	n/a
Gene ontology
Molecular function	protein homodimerization activity; acetylcholine binding; acetylcholine-gated cation-selective channel activity; amyloid-beta binding; acetylcholine receptor activity; ion channel activity; chloride channel regulator activity; extracellular ligand-gated ion channel activity; toxic substance binding; ligand-gated ion channel activity; transmembrane signaling receptor activity; calcium channel activity; protein binding
Cellular component	integral component of membrane; acetylcholine-gated channel complex; postsynaptic membrane; membrane; plasma membrane; synapse; cell junction; integral component of plasma membrane; neuron projection; plasma membrane raft; postsynapse
Biological process	response to hypoxia; cognition; cellular calcium ion homeostasis; ion transport; positive regulation of angiogenesis; ion transmembrane transport; positive regulation of cell population proliferation; transport; calcium ion transport; signal transduction; synaptic transmission, cholinergic; memory; negative regulation of tumor necrosis factor production; response to nicotine; regulation of postsynaptic membrane potential; excitatory postsynaptic potential; positive regulation of protein phosphorylation; chemical synaptic transmission; learning or memory; short-term memory; regulation of membrane potential; synapse organization; nervous system process; sensory processing; positive regulation of ERK1 and ERK2 cascade; calcium ion transmembrane transport; acetylcholine receptor signaling pathway; dendritic spine organization; modulation of excitatory postsynaptic potential; dendrite arborization; positive regulation of long-term synaptic potentiation; regulation of neuron death; positive regulation of amyloid-beta formation; negative regulation of amyloid-beta formation; regulation of amyloid precursor protein catabolic process; response to amyloid-beta; response to acetylcholine; regulation of amyloid fibril formation; positive regulation of CoA-transferase activity; positive regulation of excitatory postsynaptic potential
Sources:Amigo / QuickGO
Orthologs
Databases	NCBI: entry; OMA: entry
Species	Human	Mouse
Entrez	1139	11441
Ensembl	ENSG00000274542; ENSG00000175344; ENSG00000282088	ENSMUSG00000030525
UniProt	P36544	P49582
RefSeq (mRNA)	NM_000746; NM_001190455	NM_007390
RefSeq (protein)	NP_000737; NP_001177384	NP_031416
Location (UCSC)	Chr 15: 31.92 – 32.17 Mb	Chr 7: 62.75 – 62.86 Mb
PubMed search
- Wikidata
View/Edit Human	View/Edit Mouse

Neuronal acetylcholine receptor subunit alpha-7, also known as nAChRα7, is a protein that in humans is encoded by the CHRNA7 gene. The protein encoded by this gene is a subunit of certain nicotinic acetylcholine receptors (nAchR).

== Function ==
The nicotinic acetylcholine receptors (nAChRs) are members of a superfamily of ligand-gated ion channels that mediate fast signal transmission at synapses. The nAChRs are thought to be hetero-pentamers composed of homologous subunits. The proposed structure for each subunit is a conserved N-terminal extracellular domain followed by three conserved transmembrane domains, a variable cytoplasmic loop, a fourth conserved transmembrane domain, and a short C-terminal extracellular region. The protein encoded by this gene forms a homo-oligomeric channel, displays marked permeability to calcium ions and is a major component of brain nicotinic receptors that are blocked by, and highly sensitive to, alpha-bungarotoxin. Once this receptor binds acetylcholine, it undergoes an extensive change in conformation that affects all subunits and leads to opening of an ion-conducting channel across the plasma membrane. This gene is located in a region identified as a major susceptibility locus for juvenile myoclonic epilepsy and a chromosomal location involved in the genetic transmission of schizophrenia. An evolutionarily recent partial duplication event in this region results in a hybrid containing sequence from this gene and a novel FAM7A gene.

Disruption of alpha-7 nicotinic receptors in schizophrenia is believed to contribute at least in part to the abnormally high prevalence of extremely heavy smoking in those affected by the disease. This observed particularly high nicotine intake compared to the average smoker is hypothesized to be a subconscious effort to activate the low-affinity alpha-7 receptors.

== Interactions ==
CHRNA7 has been shown to interact with FYN.

== Gene expression ==
The CHRNA7 gene is primarily expressed in the posterior amygdalar nucleus and the field CA3 of Ammon's horn in the mouse, and in the mammillary body in humans. Gene expression patterns from the Allen Brain Atlases can be seen here.

== See also ==
- Alpha-7 nicotinic receptor
- Nicotinic acetylcholine receptor
- Acetylcholine receptor
