= Fatty acid amide =

Class of chemical compounds

Structure of anandamide, a FAA.

Fatty acid amides (FAAs) are amides formed from a fatty acid and an amine. In nature, many FAAs have ethanolamine as the amine component. Also known as N-acylethanolamines, they contain the functionality RC(O)N(H)CH_{2}CH_{2}OH. A well known example is anandamide. Other fatty acid amides are fatty acid primary amides (FAPAs). They contain the functionality RC(O)NH_{2}). Oleamide is an example of this class of FAPAs.

== Natural occurrences ==
FAAs play a role in intracellular signalling. The signalling is controlled in part by fatty acid amide hydrolases, which convert the amide to the parent fatty acid. One example of signaling is induced by the binding of anandamide to the cannabinoid receptors.

Aliphatic amides can be found in Zanthoxylum species found in Nigeria.

== See also ==
- Fatty acid ester
