= Cyclic nucleotide phosphodiesterase =

Class of enzymes

3',5'-cyclic nucleotide phosphodiesterase
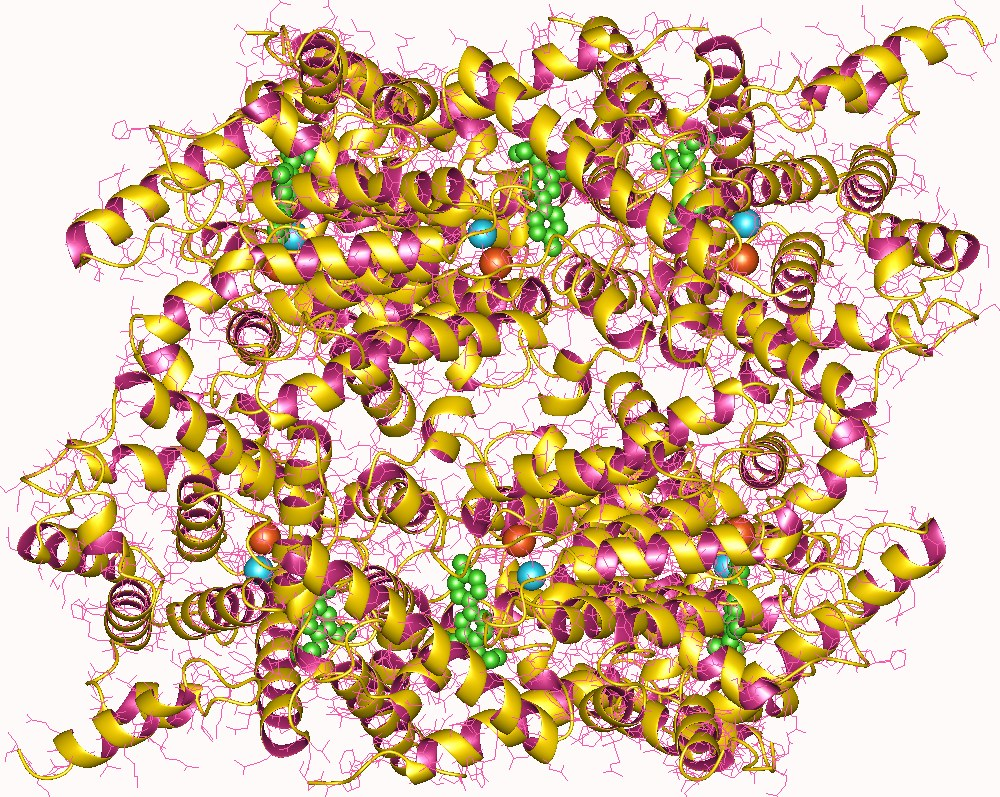
- Phosphodiesterase 4D hexamer, Human

Identifiers
- Symbol: PDEase_I
- Pfam: PF00233
- InterPro: IPR002073
- PROSITE: PDOC00116
- SCOP2: 1f0j / SCOPe / SUPFAM
- CDD: cd00077
Available protein structures:
- PDB: IPR002073 PF00233 (ECOD; PDBsum)
- AlphaFold: IPR002073; PF00233

3′,5′-cyclic-nucleotide phosphodiesterase

Identifiers
- EC no.: 3.1.4.17
- CAS no.: 9040-59-9

Databases
- BRENDA: enzyme data
- ExPASy: NiceZyme view
- KEGG: enzyme entry
- MetaCyc: metabolic pathway
- Rhea: reactions
- PDB structures: RCSB PDB PDBe PDBsum
- Gene Ontology: AmiGO / QuickGO
Search
- PMC: articles
- PubMed: articles
- NCBI: proteins

3′,5′-cyclic-nucleotide phosphodiesterases (EC 3.1.4.17) are a family of phosphodiesterases. Generally, these enzymes hydrolyze a nucleoside 3′,5′-cyclic phosphate to a nucleoside 5′-phosphate:

nucleoside 3′,5′-cyclic phosphate + H_{2}O = nucleoside 5′-phosphate

They thus control the cellular levels of the cyclic second messengers and the rates of their degradation. Some examples of nucleoside 3′,5′-cyclic phosphate include:

- 3′,5′-cyclic AMP
- 3′,5′-cyclic dAMP
- 3′,5′-cyclic IMP
- 3′,5′-cyclic GMP
- 3′,5′-cyclic CMP

There are 11 distinct phosphodiesterase families (PDE1–PDE11) with a variety in isoforms and splicing having unique three-dimensional structure, kinetic properties, modes of regulation, intracellular localization, cellular expression, and inhibitor sensitivities.

== Nomenclature ==
The systematic name for this enzyme is 3′,5′-cyclic-nucleotide 5'-nucleotidohydrolase. Other names in use include:

- PDE,
- cyclic 3′,5′-mononucleotide phosphodiesterase,
- cyclic 3',5'-nucleotide phosphodiesterase,
- cyclic 3′,5′-phosphodiesterase,
- 3′,5′-nucleotide phosphodiesterase,
- 3':5'-cyclic nucleotide 5′-nucleotidohydrolase,
- 3′,5′-cyclonucleotide phosphodiesterase,
- 3′,5′-cyclic nucleoside monophosphate phosphodiesterase,
- 3′:5′-monophosphate phosphodiesterase (cyclic CMP),
- cytidine 3′:5′-monophosphate phosphodiesterase (cyclic CMP),
- cyclic 3′,5-nucleotide monophosphate phosphodiesterase,
- nucleoside 3′,5′-cyclic phosphate diesterase, and
- nucleoside-3′,5-monophosphate phosphodiesterase.

== Function ==
=== Reaction catalysed ===
The enzyme catalyses a general reaction in which cyclic 3',5' phosphates in nucleosides are hydrolysed to give the 5' monophosphate:

nucleoside 3′,5′-cyclic phosphate + H_{2}O = nucleoside 5′-phosphate

For example, cyclic adenosine monophosphate (3',5'-cyclic AMP) is converted to adenosine monophosphate:

3',5'-cyclic AMP
H_{2}O
adenosine monophosphate

=== Phototransduction ===
Retinal 3′,5′-cGMP phosphodiesterase (PDE) is located in photoreceptor outer segments and is an important enzyme in phototransduction.

3′,5′-cyclic-nucleotide phosphodiesterases in rod cells are oligomeric, made up of two heavy catalytic subunits, α (90 kDa) and β (85 kDa,) and two lighter inhibitory γ subunits (11 kDa each).

PDE in rod cells are activated by transducin. Transducin is a G protein which upon GDP/GTP exchange in the transducin α subunit catalyzed by photolyzed rhodopsin. The transducin α subunit (Tα) is released from the β and γ complex and diffuses into the cytoplasmic solution to interact and activate PDE.

=== Activation by Tα ===
There are two proposed mechanisms for the activation of PDE. The first proposes that the two inhibitory subunits are differentially bound, sequentially removable and exchangeable between the native complex PDEαβγ_{2} and PDEαβ. GTP-bound-Tα removes the inhibitory γ subunits one at a time from the αβ catalytic subunits. The second and more likely mechanism states that the GTP-Tα complex binds to the γ subunits but rather than dissociating from the catalytic subunits, it stays with the PDEαβ complex. Binding of the GTP-Tα complex to the PDE γ subunits likely causes a conformational shift in the PDE, allowing better access to the site of cGMP hydrolysis on PDEαβ.

=== Structure ===
The binding site for PDE α and β subunits are likely to be in the central region of the PDE γ subunits. The C-terminal of the PDE γ subunit is likely to be involved in inhibition of PDE α and β subunits, the binding site for Tα and GTPase accelerating activity for the GTP-bound Tα.

In cones, PDE is a homodimer of α chains, associated with several smaller subunits. Both rod and cone PDEs catalyze the hydrolysis of cAMP or cGMP to their 5′ monophosphate form. Both enzymes also bind cGMP with high affinity. The cGMP-binding sites are located in the N-terminal half of the protein sequence, while the catalytic core resides in the C-terminal portion.

== Examples ==
Human genes encoding proteins containing this domain include:

- PDE1A, PDE1B, PDE1B2, PDE1C, PDE2A, PDE3A, PDE3B, PDE4A, PDE4B, PDE4B5, PDE4C, PDE4D,
- PDE5A, PDE6A, PDE6B, PDE6C, PDE7A, PDE7B, PDE8A, PDE8B, PDE9A,
- PDE10A, PDE10A2, PDE11A,
