= GAF domain =

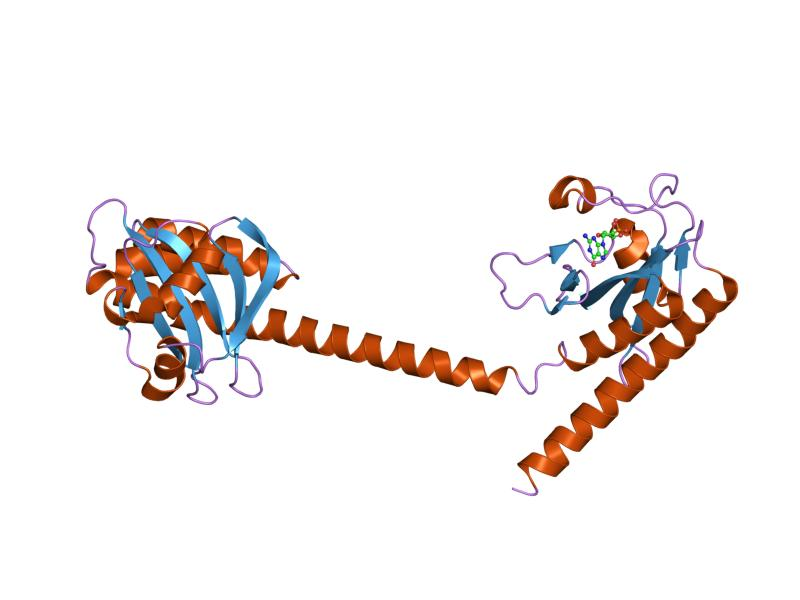
- 3',5'-Cyclic Nucleotide Phosphodiesterase 2A, Containing the GAF A and GAF B Domains.

Identifiers
- Symbol: GAF
- Pfam: PF01590
- Pfam clan: CL0161
- InterPro: IPR003018
- SMART: GAF
- SCOP2: 1fl4 / SCOPe / SUPFAM
Available protein structures:
- Pfam: structures / ECOD
- PDB: RCSB PDB; PDBe; PDBj
- PDBsum: structure summary

The GAF domain is a type of protein domain that is found in a wide range of proteins from all species. The GAF domain is named after some of the proteins it is found in: cGMP-specific phosphodiesterases, adenylyl cyclases and FhlA. The first structure of a GAF domain solved by Ho and colleagues showed that this domain shared a similar fold with the PAS domain. In mammals, GAF domains are found in five members of the cyclic nucleotide phosphodiesterase superfamily: PDE2, PDE5, and PDE6 which bind cGMP to the GAF domain, PDE10 which binds cAMP, and PDE11 which binds both cGMP and cAMP.

== Examples ==
Human proteins containing this domain include:

- PDE2A, PDE5A, PDE6A, PDE6B, PDE6C, PDE10A, PDE11A
