= PDE6B =

Protein-coding gene in the species Homo sapiens

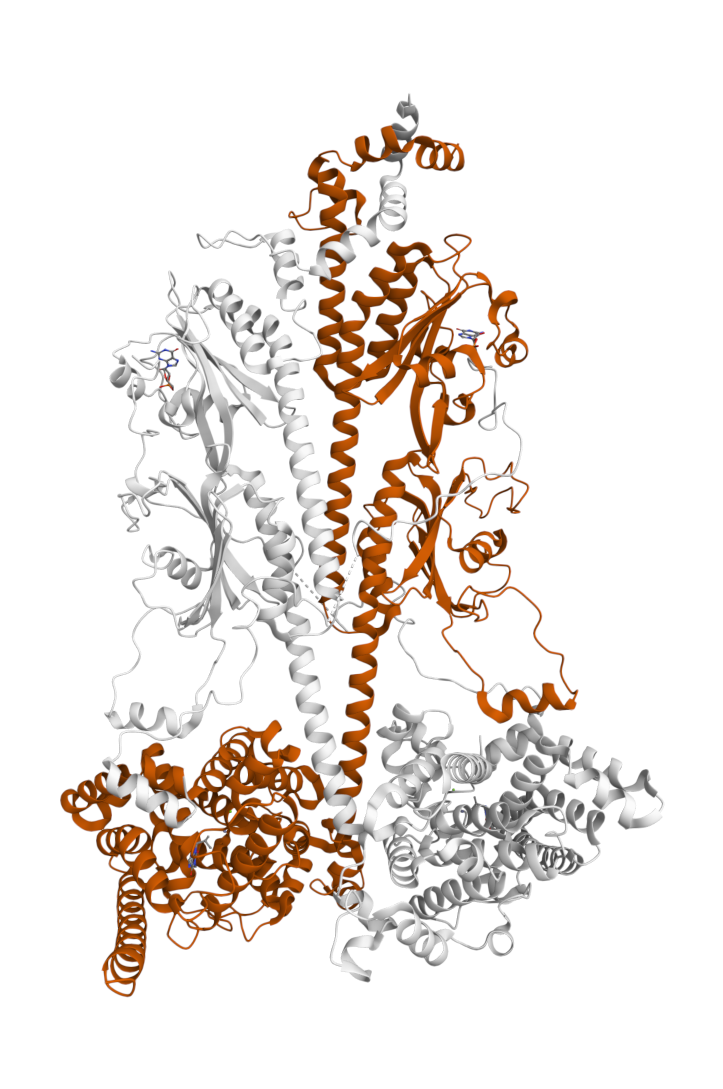

Identifiers
- Aliases: PDE6B, CSNB3, CSNBAD2, PDEB, RP40, rd1, phosphodiesterase 6B, GMP-PDEbeta
- External IDs: OMIM: 180072; MGI: 97525; GeneCards: PDE6B
Enzyme activity
EC #	BRENDA	ExPASy	KEGG	MetaCyc
3.1.4.35	↗	↗	↗	↗

Gene location (Human)
Chr.	Chromosome 4 (human)
Band	4p16.3	Start	625,573 bp
Band	4p16.3	End	670,782 bp

Gene location (Mouse)
Chr.	Chromosome 5 (mouse)
Band	5 F|5 53.07 cM	Start	108,536,257 bp
Band	5 F|5 53.07 cM	End	108,580,263 bp
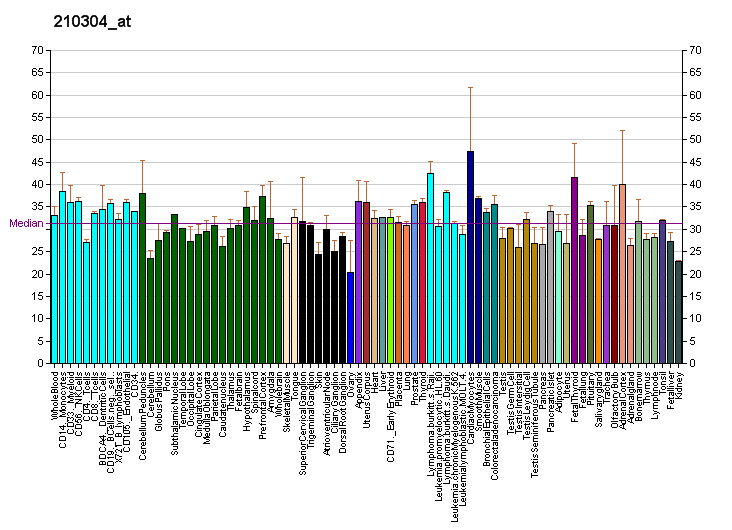
RNA expression pattern
Bgee	Human / Mouse (ortholog); Top expressed in: C1 segment; right uterine tube; right frontal lobe; nucleus accumbens; caudate nucleus; putamen; amygdala; granulocyte; left lobe of thyroid gland; right lobe of thyroid gland / Top expressed in: neural layer of retina; retinal pigment epithelium; epithelium of lens; corneal stroma; ciliary body; iris; primary oocyte; secondary oocyte; embryo; pineal gland; More reference expression data
BioGPS	More reference expression data
Gene ontology
Molecular function	phosphoric diester hydrolase activity; hydrolase activity; metal ion binding; 3',5'-cyclic-nucleotide phosphodiesterase activity; 3',5'-cyclic-GMP phosphodiesterase activity
Cellular component	plasma membrane; photoreceptor disc membrane; photoreceptor outer segment; membrane
Biological process	detection of light stimulus; retina development in camera-type eye; response to stimulus; visual perception; GMP metabolic process; signal transduction; phototransduction of visible light; regulation of cytosolic calcium ion concentration; regulation of rhodopsin mediated signaling pathway; G protein-coupled receptor signaling pathway; rhodopsin mediated signaling pathway; Wnt signaling pathway, calcium modulating pathway
Sources:Amigo / QuickGO
Orthologs
Databases	NCBI: entry; OMA: entry
Species	Human	Mouse
Entrez	5158	18587
Ensembl	ENSG00000133256	ENSMUSG00000029491
UniProt	P35913	P23440
RefSeq (mRNA)	NM_000283; NM_001145291; NM_001145292; NM_001350154; NM_001350155 NM_001379246; NM_001379247	NM_008806
RefSeq (protein)	NP_000274; NP_001138763; NP_001138764; NP_001337083; NP_001337084 NP_001366175; NP_001366176	NP_032832
Location (UCSC)	Chr 4: 0.63 – 0.67 Mb	Chr 5: 108.54 – 108.58 Mb
PubMed search
- Wikidata
View/Edit Human	View/Edit Mouse

Rod cGMP-specific 3',5'-cyclic phosphodiesterase subunit beta is the beta subunit of the protein complex PDE6 that is encoded by the PDE6B gene. PDE6 is crucial in transmission and amplification of visual signal. The existence of this beta subunit is essential for normal PDE6 functioning. Mutations in this subunit are responsible for retinal degeneration such as retinitis pigmentosa or congenital stationary night blindness.

== Structure ==
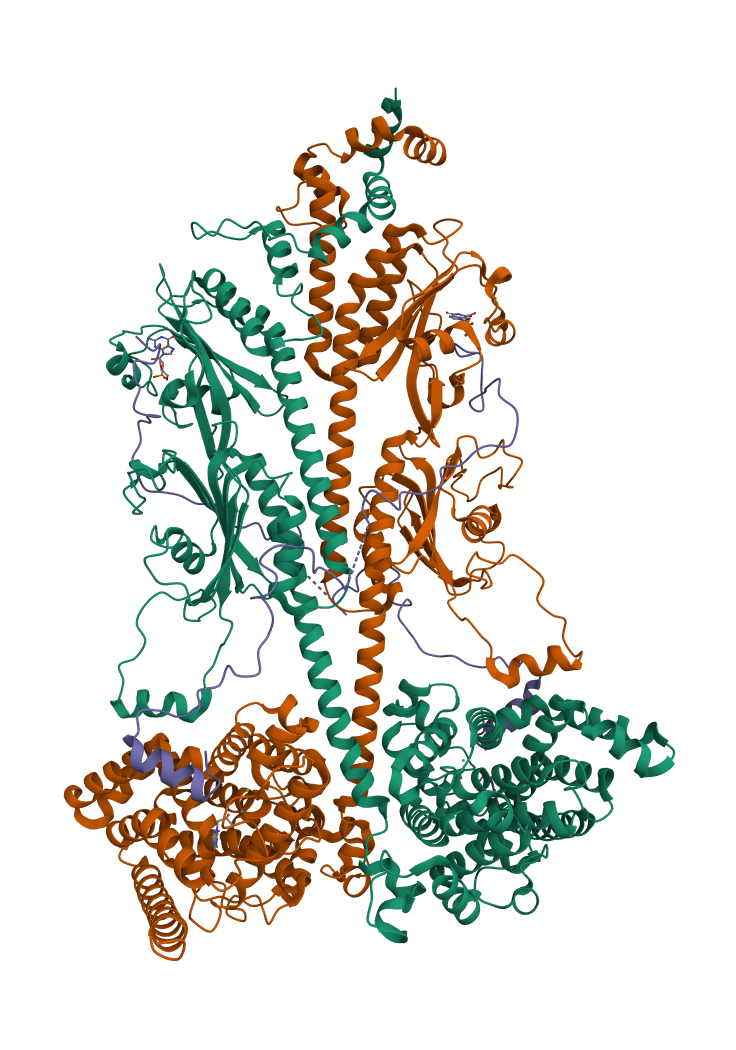
Structure of Rod Phosphodiesterase 6 complex, Bos taurus green: Rod cGMP-specific 3',5'-cyclic phosphodiesterase subunit alpha, Gene names: PDE6A, PDEA red: Rod cGMP-specific 3',5'-cyclic phosphodiesterase subunit beta, Gene names: PDE6B, PDEB blue: Retinal rod rhodopsin-sensitive cGMP 3',5'-cyclic phosphodiesterase subunit gamma, Gene names: PDE6G, PDEG

PDE6 is a protein complex located on the photoreceptor's outer segment, and plays an important role in the phototransduction cascade. There are two types of photoreceptors: cones and rods. The rod and cone PDE6 complexes have different structures. PDE6β together with PDE6α and two identical inhibitory subunits, PDE6γ, form the rod PDE6 holoenzyme while the cone PDE6 complex only consists of two identical PDE6α' catalytic subunits. PDE6β, one of the catalytic units in rod PDE6, is composed of three domains: two N-terminal GAF domains and one C-terminal catalytic domain. The non-catalytic GAF domains are responsible for cGMP binding. The C-terminal interacts with cell membrane by isoprenylation and S-carboxylmethylation.

== Function ==
Absorption of photons by rhodopsin triggers a signal transduction cascade in rod photoreceptors. This phototransduction cascade leads to hydrolysis of cGMP by cGMP-phosphodiesterase (PDE) that closes cGMP-gated channels and hyperpolarizes the cell. PDE6β is necessary for the formation of a functional phosphodiesterase holoenzyme.

=== Function of PDE6 ===
PDE6 is a highly concentrated protein in retinal photoreceptors. With the presence of the GAF domain, PDE6 can actively bind to the cGMP. The inactive PDE6 in the dark allows cGMP to bind to cGMP gated ion channels. The channel remains open as long as cGMP is binding to it, which allows constant electron flow in to the photoreceptor cell through the plasma membrane. Light causes the visual pigment, rhodopsin, to activate. This process leads to the release of subunit PDE6γ from PDE6αβ, activating PDE6 which leads to the hydrolysis of cGMP. Without the cGMP binding, the ion channel closes, leading to the hyperpolarization. After hyperpolarization the presnaptic transmitter is reduced. Next, the enzyme guanylate cyclase restores cGMP, which reopens the membrane channels. This process is called light adaptation.

=== Function of PDE6B ===
PDE6β is the only protein that undergoes the two types of post-translational modification, prenylation and carboxymethylation. The geranylgeranyl group of PDE6B is the result of these modifications, which are responsible for the rod PDE6's interaction with membrane.

The figure at left shows the PDE6 aalpha/beta dimer in blue and purple, with the gamma ubunits in green and orange.

== Animal studies ==
=== rd1 mouse ===
Mutation of the PDE6b gene leads to the dysfunction of PDE, which results in failure of hydrolysis of cGMP. The rd1 mouse is a well-characterized animal model of retinitis pigmentosa caused by the mutation of Pde6b gene. The phenotype was first discovered in rodless mice in the 1920s by Keeler. An insertion of Murine leukemia provirus is present near the first exon combined with a point mutation, which introduces a stop codon in exon 7. In addition to the rd1 mouse, a missense mutation (R560C) in exon 13 of the Pde6b gene is the character of another animal model of recessive retinal degeneration.

In rd1 animals, the retinal rod photoreceptor cells begin degenerating at about postnatal day 10, and by 3 weeks no rod photoreceptors remain. Degeneration is preceded by accumulation of cGMP in the retina and is correlated with deficient activity of the rod photoreceptor cGMP-phosphodiesterase. Cone photoreceptors undergo a slower degeneration over the course of a year, which causes the mutants to completely go blind. The possibility of altering the course of retinal degeneration through subretinal injection of recombinant replication defective adenovirus that contained the murine cDNA for wildtype PDE6β was tested in rd1 mice. Subretinal injection of rd1 mice was carried out 4 days after birth, before the onset of rod photoreceptor degeneration. Following therapy, Pde6β transcripts and enzyme activity were detected, and histologic studies revealed that photoreceptor cell death was significantly retarded.

The albino FVB mouse laboratory strain become blind by weaning age due to a mutant allele of the PDE6b gene. There are pigmented derivative strains of FVB that lack this trait.

=== rcd1 dog ===
Similar to rd1 in mice, Rod-cone dysplasia type 1 (rcd1-PRA) is a form of progressive retinal atrophy (PRA), with early onset of the disease. The Irish Setter is a characterized animal model of rcd1. The mutation is caused by a nonsense mutation in pde6b gene. Photoreceptors start degeneration at postnatal day 13 until a year after the dog is totally blind.
