= Phosphodiesterase 9 inhibitor =

Class of drug

Phosphodiesterase 9 inhibitors or PDE9 inhibitors are a class of drugs that work by inhibiting the activity of PDE9. The first compound with this effect, BAY 73-6691, was reported in 2004. PDE9 inhibitors are under investigation for the treatment of obesity, hepatic fibrosis, Alzheimer's disease, schizophrenia, other psychotic disorders, heart failure, and sickle cell anemia. Drug candidates include CRD-733, osoresnontrine, tovinontrine, and PF-04447943. Cannabidiol acts as a PDE9 inhibitor in vitro. There are no PDE9 inhibitors that have been approved as of 2023.
