= Zaprinast =

Names
- IUPAC name 5-(2-Propoxyphenyl)-1H-[1,2,3]triazolo[4,5-d]pyrimidin-7(4H)-one
- Other names M&B 22,948

Identifiers
CAS Number	37762-06-4
3D model (JSmol)	Interactive image
ChEBI	CHEBI:92215
ChEMBL	ChEMBL28079
ChemSpider	5520
ECHA InfoCard	100.048.760
EC Number	253-655-1
IUPHAR/BPS	2919
PubChem CID	135399235
UNII	GXT25D5DS0
CompTox Dashboard (EPA)	DTXSID8045224
- InChI: InChI=1S/C13H13N5O2/c1-2-7-20-9-6-4-3-5-8(9)11-14-12-10(13(19)15-11)16-18-17-12/h3-6H,2,7H2,1H3,(H2,14,15,16,17,18,19) Key: REZGGXNDEMKIQB-UHFFFAOYSA-N
- SMILES: O=C1C2=C(N=NN2)NC(C3=CC=CC=C3OCCC)=N1

Properties
Chemical formula	C_{13}H_{13}N_{5}O_{2}
Molar mass	271.280 g·mol^{−1}
- Except where otherwise noted, data are given for materials in their standard state (at 25 °C [77 °F], 100 kPa). verify (what is ?) Infobox references

Zaprinast was an unsuccessful clinical drug candidate that was a precursor to the chemically related PDE5 inhibitors, such as sildenafil (Viagra), which successfully reached the market. It is a phosphodiesterase inhibitor, selective for the subtypes PDE5, PDE6, PDE9 and PDE11. IC_{50} values are 0.76, 0.15, 29.0, and 12.0 μM, respectively.

Zaprinast inhibits the growth of asexual blood-stage malaria parasites (P. falciparum) in vitro with an ED_{50} value of 35 μM, and inhibits PfPDE1, a P. falciparum cGMP-specific phosphodiesterase, with an IC_{50} value of 3.8 μM.

Zaprinast has also been shown to activate the orphan G-protein coupled receptor known as GPR35, both in rats and humans, and to inhibit the mitochondrial pyruvate carrier.
