= PDE6 =

Photoreceptor phosphodiesterase 6 (PDE6 or PDE-6) is a protein complex family, which is highly concentrated in the retina.

== See also ==
- cGMP
- PDE6A
- PDE6B
- PDE6C
- PDE6D
- PDE6G
