= BRL-50481 =

Chemical compound

Clinical data
- ATC code: None

Identifiers
- IUPAC name: N,N,2-Trimethyl-5-nitrobenzenesulfonamide
- CAS Number: 433695-36-4
- PubChem CID: 2921148
- IUPHAR/BPS: 5154
- ChemSpider: 2194720
- UNII: 03G869PR3P
- ChEBI: CHEBI:93472
- ChEMBL: ChEMBL484928
- CompTox Dashboard (EPA): DTXSID30195832

Chemical and physical data
- Formula: C_{9}H_{12}N_{2}O_{4}S
- Molar mass: 244.27 g·mol^{−1}
- 3D model (JSmol): Interactive image
- SMILES: Cc1ccc(N(=O)=O)cc1S(=O)(=O)N(C)C
- InChI: InChI=1S/C9H12N2O4S/c1-7-4-5-8(11(12)13)6-9(7)16(14,15)10(2)3/h4-6H,1-3H3; Key:IFIUFCJFLGCQPH-UHFFFAOYSA-N

BRL-50481 is a drug developed by GlaxoSmithKline which is the first compound that acts as a phosphodiesterase inhibitor selective for the PDE7 family. PDE7 activity is encoded by two genes, PDE7A and PDE7B. BRL-50481 actually shows about an 80-fold preference for the PDE7A subtype, for which it was developed, over PDE7B. BRL-50481 has been shown to increase mineralisation activity in osteoblasts, suggesting a potential role for PDE7 inhibitors in the treatment of osteoporosis.
