= 3',5'-cyclic-GMP phosphodiesterase =

Class of enzymes

3′,5′-cyclic-GMP phosphodiesterase

Identifiers
- EC no.: 3.1.4.35
- CAS no.: 9068-52-4

Databases
- BRENDA: enzyme data
- ExPASy: NiceZyme view
- KEGG: enzyme entry
- MetaCyc: metabolic pathway
- Rhea: reactions
- PDB structures: RCSB PDB PDBe PDBsum
- Gene Ontology: AmiGO / QuickGO
Search
- PMC: articles
- PubMed: articles
- NCBI: proteins

The enzyme 3′,5′-cyclic-GMP phosphodiesterase (EC 3.1.4.35) catalyzes the reaction

3',5'-cyclic GMP
H_{2}O
guanosine monophosphate

The enzyme characterised from mice hydrolyses cyclic guanosine monophosphate (3',5'-cyclic GMP) to guanosine monophosphate. Unlike the enzyme cyclic nucleotide phosphodiesterase (EC 3.1.4.17) this reaction is specific to 3',5'-cyclic GMP.

This enzyme is a hydrolase, specifically one acting on phosphoric diester bonds. The systematic name is 3′,5′-cyclic-GMP 5'-nucleotidohydrolase. Other names in use include guanosine cyclic 3',5'-phosphate phosphodiesterase, cyclic GMP phosphodiesterase, cyclic 3′,5′-GMP phosphodiesterase, cyclic guanosine 3′,5′-monophosphate phosphodiesterase, cyclic guanosine 3′,5′-phosphate phosphodiesterase, cGMP phosphodiesterase, cGMP-PDE, and cyclic guanosine 3′,5′-phosphate phosphodiesterase.

== Structural studies ==
As of late 2007, 5 structures have been solved for this class of enzymes, with PDB accession codes PDB: 1MC0, PDB: 2CHM, PDB: 2H40, PDB: 2H42, and PDB: 2H44.
