= C9H12N2O4S =

The molecular formula C_{9}H_{12}N_{2}O_{4}S (molar mass: 244.268 g/mol, exact mass: 244.0518 u) may refer to:

- BRL-50481
- Pidotimod
