= PDE10 =

Phosphodiesterase type 10 (PDE10) is a type of phosphodiesterase enzyme, which breaks down cAMP and cGMP messenger molecules.

Some inhibitors include papaverine, PF-2545920, TC-E 5005, and tofisopam.
