= PDE9A =

Protein-coding gene in the species Homo sapiens

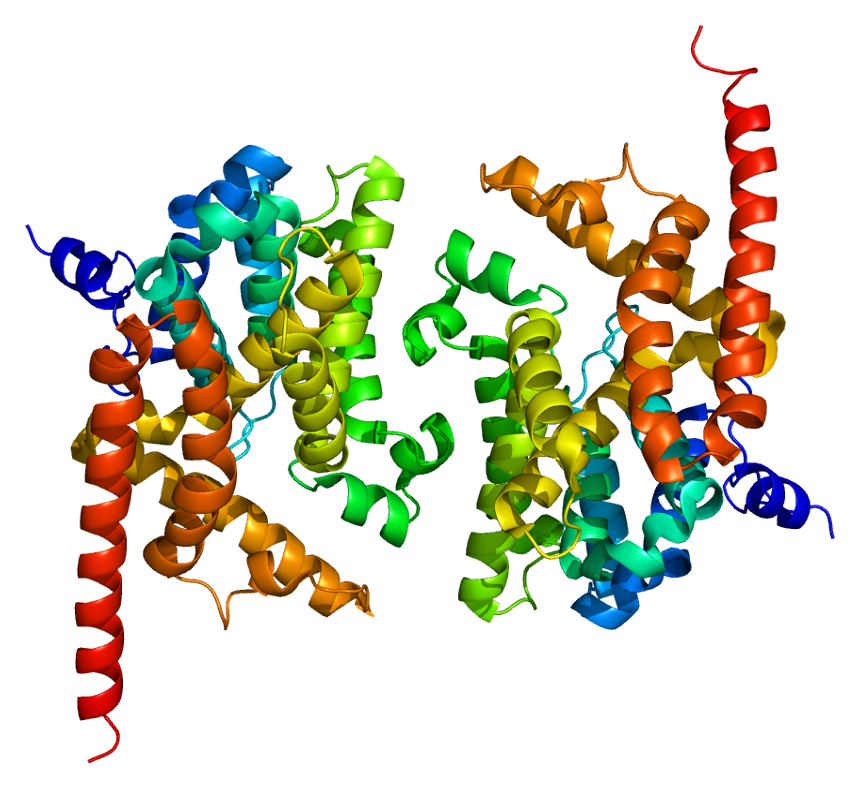
Available structures
PDB	Ortholog search: PDBe RCSB
PDB	List of PDB id codes 2HD1, 2YY2, 3DY8, 3DYL, 3DYN, 3DYQ, 3DYS, 3JSI, 3JSW, 3K3E, 3K3H, 3N3Z, 3QI3, 3QI4, 4E90, 4G2J, 4G2L, 4GH6, 4Y86, 4Y87, 4Y8C

Identifiers
- Aliases: PDE9A, HSPDE9A2, phosphodiesterase 9A
- External IDs: OMIM: 602973; MGI: 1277179; HomoloGene: 113565; GeneCards: PDE9A; OMA:PDE9A - orthologs
- EC number: 3.1.4.35

Gene location (Human)
Chr.	Chromosome 21 (human)
Band	21q22.3	Start	42,653,621 bp
Band	21q22.3	End	42,775,509 bp

Gene location (Mouse)
Chr.	Chromosome 17 (mouse)
Band	17|17 B1	Start	31,386,210 bp
Band	17|17 B1	End	31,476,310 bp
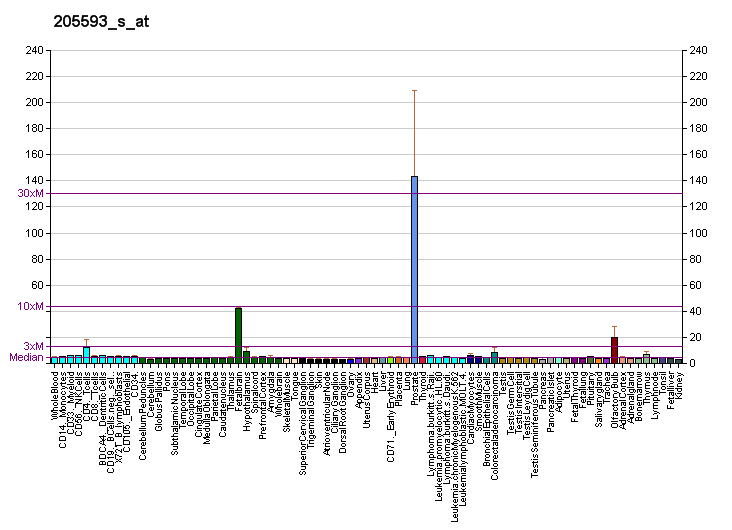
RNA expression pattern
Bgee	Human / Mouse (ortholog); Top expressed in: mucosa of transverse colon; muscle layer of sigmoid colon; ganglionic eminence; ventricular zone; oocyte; sural nerve; prostate; rectum; optic nerve; secondary oocyte / Top expressed in: colon; duodenum; left colon; jejunum; cerebellar vermis; ileum; lobe of cerebellum; crypt of lieberkuhn of small intestine; olfactory tubercle; yolk sac; More reference expression data
BioGPS	More reference expression data
Gene ontology
Molecular function	3',5'-cyclic-nucleotide phosphodiesterase activity; metal ion binding; protein binding; phosphoric diester hydrolase activity; hydrolase activity; 3',5'-cyclic-GMP phosphodiesterase activity
Cellular component	cytoplasm; cytosol; perikaryon; Golgi apparatus; cell projection; membrane; plasma membrane; ruffle membrane; endoplasmic reticulum; perinuclear region of cytoplasm; sarcolemma
Biological process	cGMP metabolic process; cGMP-mediated signaling; positive regulation of cardiac muscle hypertrophy; cGMP catabolic process; signal transduction
Sources:Amigo / QuickGO
Orthologs
Species	Human	Mouse
Entrez	5152	18585
Ensembl	ENSG00000160191	ENSMUSG00000041119
UniProt	O76083	O70628
RefSeq (mRNA)	NM_001001567; NM_001001568; NM_001001569; NM_001001570; NM_001001571 NM_001001572; NM_001001573; NM_001001574; NM_001001575; NM_001001576; NM_001001577; NM_001001578; NM_001001579; NM_001001580; NM_001001581; NM_001001582; NM_001001583; NM_001001584; NM_001001585; NM_002606; NM_001315533	NM_001163748; NM_008804
RefSeq (protein)	NP_001001567; NP_001001568; NP_001001569; NP_001001570; NP_001001571 NP_001001572; NP_001001573; NP_001001574; NP_001001575; NP_001001576; NP_001001577; NP_001001578; NP_001001579; NP_001001580; NP_001001581; NP_001001582; NP_001001583; NP_001001584; NP_001001585; NP_001302462; NP_002597	NP_001157220; NP_032830
Location (UCSC)	Chr 21: 42.65 – 42.78 Mb	Chr 17: 31.39 – 31.48 Mb
PubMed search
- Wikidata
View/Edit Human	View/Edit Mouse

High affinity cGMP-specific 3',5'-cyclic phosphodiesterase 9A is an enzyme that in humans is encoded by the PDE9A gene.

The protein encoded by this gene catalyzes the hydrolysis of cAMP and cGMP to their corresponding monophosphates. The encoded protein plays a role in signal transduction by regulating the intracellular concentration of these cyclic nucleotides. Multiple transcript variants encoding several different isoforms have been found for this gene.

== Inhibitors ==
- BAY 73-6691
- PF-04447943

== See also ==
- Phosphodiesterase
