= FVB mouse =

FVB is an albino, inbred laboratory mouse strain that is named after its susceptibility to Friend leukemia virus B.

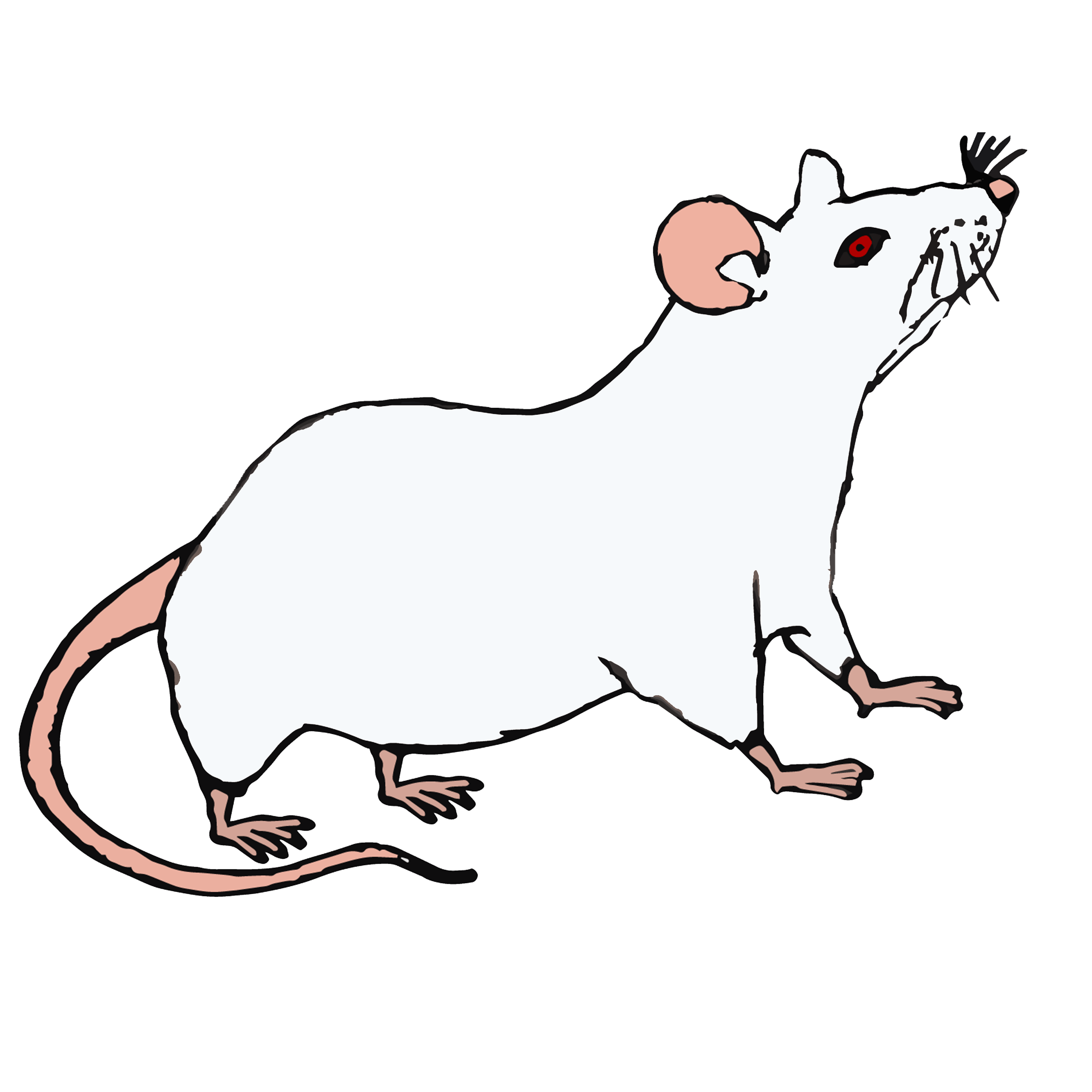
An FVB mouse

== History ==
This strain was produced from mice established at the National Institutes of Health in 1935. In 1966, mice from this founding population were bred for sensitivity or resistance to challenge with histamine following pertussis vaccination. In 1970, of the sensitive mice from that breeding, some were found to be susceptible to Friend leukaemia virus. These mice were bred into the modern FVB strain at the Jackson Laboratory, with no subsequent selection for histamine sensitivity.

== Characteristics ==
In addition to albinism and Friend leukemia virus sensitivity, these mice become blind by weaning age due to being homozygous for a retinal deterioration allele on the PDE6B gene. Rods are lost within 9 weeks of birth, while cones may persist until 18 months of age. These mice have greater susceptibility to an asthma-like phenotype than wild-type animals. They are resistant to collagen-induced arthritis. Their body temperature is above the average seen in other mice. They are susceptible to induced squamous cell carcinoma. They have large litter sizes, and their oocytes possess prominent pronuclei, making them ideal for transgenic research. This phenotype is observed only in the oocytes, not the sperm.

Approximately 60% of FVB Mice regardless of sex survive to two years of age. By this point, approximately 60% of surviving mice show tumors/lesions. Some sudden deaths are observed in younger animals, but most die at 15 months or older. Two years is a common life expectancy in wild-type house mice.

== Behavior ==
FVB mice show above average activity and anxiety. Because of their visual impairment, they do not show normal circadian rhythms. For the same reason, they struggle with visual tasks such as the Morris watermaze. Some studies suggest the presence of non-visual cognitive impairment in other tasks such as fear conditioning. FVB mice show elevated aggressive behavior towards newly intruding FVB mice shortly after the new mouse's introduction, potentially due to chronically disrupted circadian rhythms.

== Sighted and pigmented derivative ==
A derivative strain called sighted FVB was developed from this strain via backcrossing. The full name of this strain is FVB.129P2-Pde6b^{+} Tyr^{c-ch}/AntJ, reflecting its genotype. They show grey pigmentation. They are suggested for use in studies where FVB genetic background is desired, but the animals must be sighted. For example, this would apply to behavioral studies.
