= PDE7A =

Protein-coding gene in the species Homo sapiens

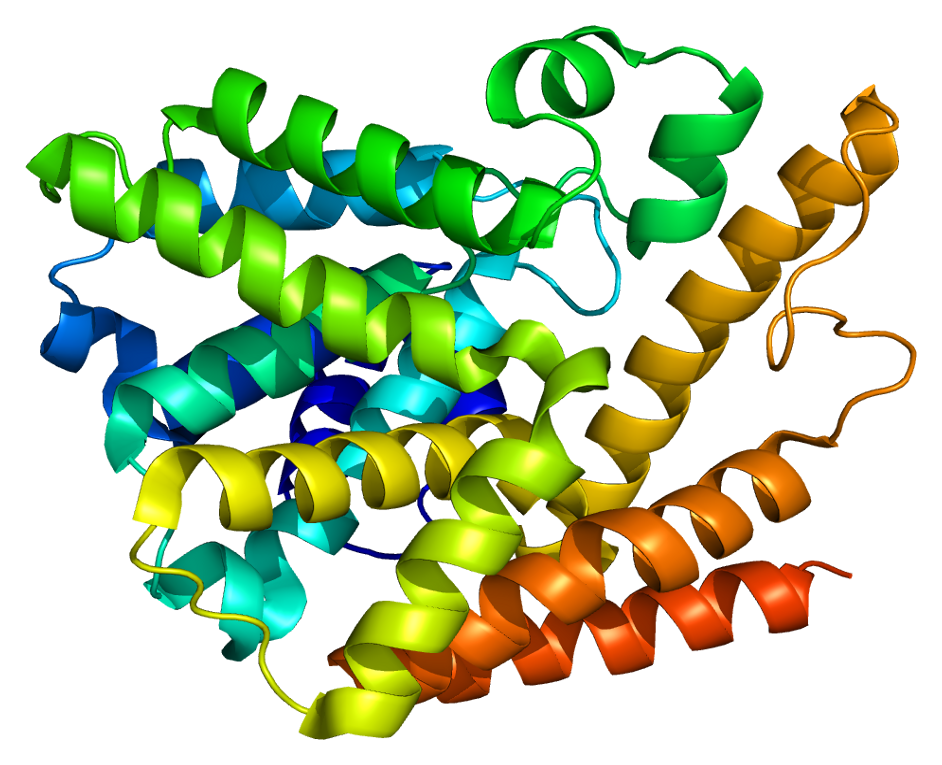
Available structures
PDB	Ortholog search: PDBe RCSB
PDB	List of PDB id codes 1ZKL, 3G3N, 4PM0, 4Y2B

Identifiers
- Aliases: PDE7A, HCP1, PDE7, phosphodiesterase 7A
- External IDs: OMIM: 171885; MGI: 1202402; HomoloGene: 1956; GeneCards: PDE7A; OMA:PDE7A - orthologs
- EC number: 3.1.4.53

Gene location (Human)
Chr.	Chromosome 8 (human)
Band	8q13.1	Start	65,714,334 bp
Band	8q13.1	End	65,842,322 bp

Gene location (Mouse)
Chr.	Chromosome 3 (mouse)
Band	3 A2|3 5.36 cM	Start	19,277,272 bp
Band	3 A2|3 5.36 cM	End	19,365,486 bp
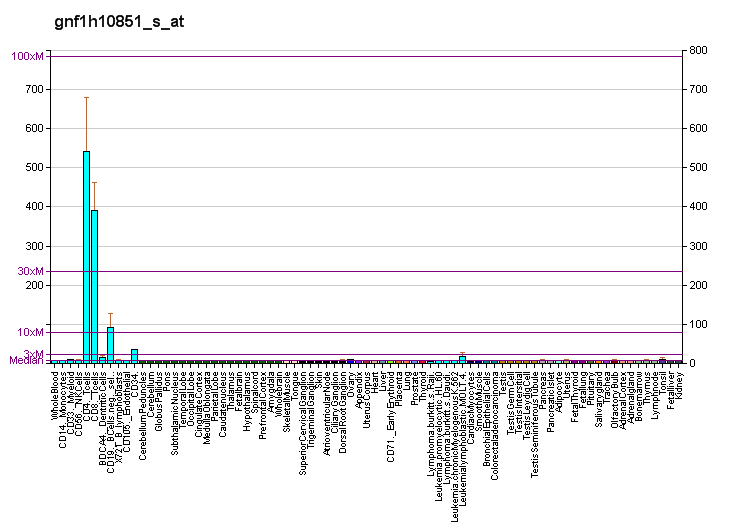
RNA expression pattern
Bgee	Human / Mouse (ortholog); Top expressed in: secondary oocyte; thymus; Skeletal muscle tissue of rectus abdominis; apex of heart; muscle of thigh; lymph node; gastrocnemius muscle; deltoid muscle; appendix; right auricle of heart / Top expressed in: left lung lobe; spermatocyte; Rostral migratory stream; conjunctival fornix; left colon; ganglionic eminence; primitive streak; spermatid; muscle of thigh; mandibular prominence; More reference expression data
BioGPS	More reference expression data
Gene ontology
Molecular function	hydrolase activity; metal ion binding; phosphoric diester hydrolase activity; 3',5'-cyclic-nucleotide phosphodiesterase activity; 3',5'-cyclic-AMP phosphodiesterase activity
Cellular component	cytosol; cytoplasm
Biological process	cAMP catabolic process; signal transduction; G protein-coupled receptor signaling pathway
Sources:Amigo / QuickGO
Orthologs
Species	Human	Mouse
Entrez	5150	18583
Ensembl	ENSG00000205268	ENSMUSG00000069094
UniProt	Q13946	P70453
RefSeq (mRNA)	NM_001242318; NM_002603; NM_002604	NM_001122759; NM_008802
RefSeq (protein)	NP_001229247; NP_002594	NP_001116231; NP_032828
Location (UCSC)	Chr 8: 65.71 – 65.84 Mb	Chr 3: 19.28 – 19.37 Mb
PubMed search
- Wikidata
View/Edit Human	View/Edit Mouse

High affinity cAMP-specific 3',5'-cyclic phosphodiesterase 7A is an enzyme that in humans is encoded by the PDE7A gene. Mammals possess 21 cyclic nucleotide phosphodiesterase (PDE) genes that are pharmacologically grouped into 11 families. PDE7A is one of two genes in the PDE7 family, the other being PDE7B. The PDE7 family, along with the PDE4 and PDE8 families, are cAMP-specific, showing little to no activity against 3', 5'-cyclic guanosine monophosphate (cGMP).
