= Osoresnontrine =

Chemical compound

Clinical data
- Other names: BI-409306

Legal status
- Legal status: Investigational

Identifiers
- IUPAC name: 1-(Oxan-4-yl)-6-(pyridin-2-ylmethyl)-5H-pyrazolo[3,4-d]pyrimidin-4-one
- CAS Number: 1189767-28-9
- PubChem CID: 135908617
- UNII: O9OC34WOAY

Chemical and physical data
- Formula: C_{16}H_{17}N_{5}O_{2}
- Molar mass: 311.345 g·mol^{−1}

Osoresnontrine (BI-409306) is a phosphodiesterase 9 inhibitor in development for schizophrenia, attenuated psychosis syndrome, and Alzheimer's disease. A preclinical study suggested that it increases memory in rodents.

== See also ==
- List of investigational antipsychotics
- List of investigational cognition and memory disorder drugs
