= PDE11 =

Class of enzymes

Phosphodiesterase type 11 (PDE11) is a type of phosphodiesterase enzyme.

An inhibitor is BC11-38 & Tadalafil.
