= Benjamin Weiss (scientist) =

American neuropharmacologist (born 1937)

- Education: Philadelphia College of Pharmacy (Now part of Saint Joseph's University, Philadelphia, Pennsylvania)
- Known for: Neuropharmacology; Phosphodiesterase inhibition
- Spouse: Joyce Zelnick (m. 1959)
- Scientific career
- Workplaces: Drexel University

Benjamin Weiss (born 1937) is an American neuropharmacologist and Emeritus Professor of Pharmacology and Physiology at Drexel University College of Medicine.

As of 1982, his research focused on "the effects of age on brain function and on the influence of psychotropic drugs on the brain."

== Early life and education ==
Weiss was born in 1937. He went to high school in Toms River, New Jersey. He received his undergraduate degree in pharmacy in 1958 from the Philadelphia College of Pharmacy (later acquired by Saint Joseph's University). He received earned a M.Sc. in 1960 and a Ph.D. in Pharmacology in 1963 from the same university. As a graduate student he published a co-authored paper in Nature with G. Victor Rossi.

== Career ==
Weiss was a professor of pharmacology at the Medical College of Pennsylvania, now known as the Drexel University College of Medicine.

In 1981, he was cited by Current Contents as one of the "1,000 scientist-authors most-cited for work published from 1965-1978."

He was editor of two books. He has also published over 300 scientific articles.

== Personal life ==
Weiss married Joyce Zelnick in 1959.

== Selected publications ==
- ———; Rossi, G. Victor (July 1962). "Separation of Catecholamines by Paper Chromatography". Nature. 195 (4837): 178. Bibcode:1962Natur.195..178W. doi:10.1038/195178a0. PMID 14005856.
- Krishna, Gopal; ———; Brodie, Bernard B. (1 October 1968). "A simple, sensitive method for the assay of adenyl cyclase". The Journal of Pharmacology and Experimental Therapeutics. 163 (2): 379–385. doi:10.1016/S0022-3565(25)28084-3. PMID 4300679.
- Weiss, Benjamin, ed. (1975). Cyclic nucleotides in disease: proceedings of the Symposium Cyclic Nucleotides in Disease ... Philadelphia, 4 - 5 April 1974. Baltimore: Univ. Park Press. ISBN 9780839107651.
- Levin, Robert M.; ——— (July 1976). "Mechanism by Which Psychotropic Drugs Inhibit Adenosine Cyclic 3',5'-Monophosphate Phosphodiesterase of Brain". Molecular Pharmacology. 12 (4): 581–589. doi:10.1016/S0026-895X(25)10787-6. PMID 183095.
- Levin, Robert M.; ——— (July 1977). "Binding of Trifluoperazine to the Calcium-Dependent Activator of Cyclic Nucleotide Phosphodiesterase". Molecular Pharmacology. 13 (4): 690–697. doi:10.1016/S0026-895X(25)12432-2.
- ———; Levin, Robert M. (1978). "Mechanism for selectively inhibiting the activation of cyclic nucleotide phosphodiesterase and adenylate cyclase by antipsychotic agents". Advances in Cyclic Nucleotide Research. 9: 285–303. PMID 27079.
- Levin, Robert M.; ——— (March 1979). "Selective binding of antipsychotics and other psychoactive agents to the calcium-dependent activator of cyclic nucleotide phosphodiesterase". The Journal of Pharmacology and Experimental Therapeutics. 208 (3): 454–9. doi:10.1016/S0022-3565(25)31595-8. PMID 34709.
- Weiss, Benjamin, ed. (1997). Antisense oligodeoxynucleotides and antisense RNA: novel pharmacological and therapeutic agents. Roca Raton, Fla: CRC Press. ISBN 9780849385520.
