= PDE1C =

Protein-coding gene in the species Homo sapiens

Available structures
PDB	Ortholog search: PDBe RCSB
PDB	List of PDB id codes 1LXS

Identifiers
- Aliases: PDE1C, Hcam3, cam-PDE 1C, hCam-3, phosphodiesterase 1C, DFNA74
- External IDs: OMIM: 602987; MGI: 108413; HomoloGene: 3682; GeneCards: PDE1C; OMA:PDE1C - orthologs

Gene location (Human)
Chr.	Chromosome 7 (human)
Band	7p14.3	Start	31,751,179 bp
Band	7p14.3	End	32,428,131 bp

Gene location (Mouse)
Chr.	Chromosome 6 (mouse)
Band	6 B3|6 27.65 cM	Start	56,046,789 bp
Band	6 B3|6 27.65 cM	End	56,629,472 bp
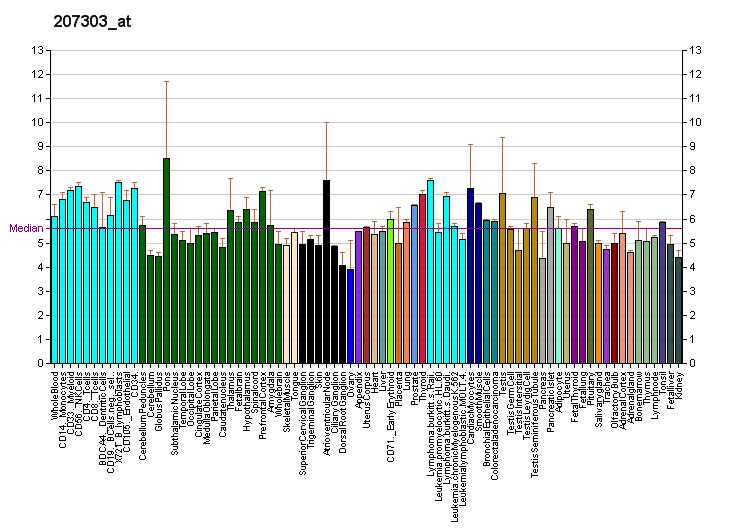

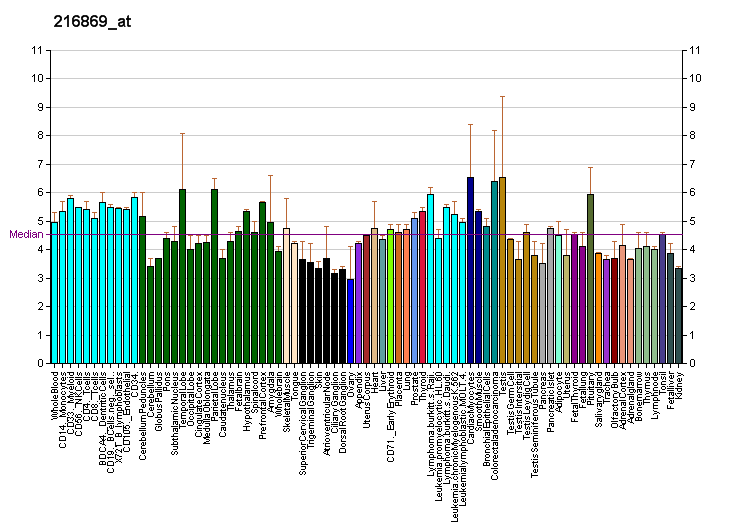
RNA expression pattern
Bgee	Human / Mouse (ortholog); Top expressed in: endothelial cell; right ventricle; corpus callosum; apex of heart; left ventricle; sural nerve; inferior ganglion of vagus nerve; external globus pallidus; internal globus pallidus; right auricle of heart / Top expressed in: lumbar spinal ganglion; spermatocyte; spermatid; retinal pigment epithelium; supraoptic nucleus; aortic valve; ascending aorta; ciliary body; iris; olfactory epithelium; More reference expression data
BioGPS	More reference expression data
Gene ontology
Molecular function	phosphoric diester hydrolase activity; calmodulin-dependent cyclic-nucleotide phosphodiesterase activity; hydrolase activity; 3',5'-cyclic-nucleotide phosphodiesterase activity; metal ion binding; calmodulin binding; calcium- and calmodulin-regulated 3',5'-cyclic-GMP phosphodiesterase activity; 3',5'-cyclic-GMP phosphodiesterase activity
Cellular component	cytosol; soma
Biological process	signal transduction
Sources:Amigo / QuickGO
Orthologs
Species	Human	Mouse
Entrez	5137	18575
Ensembl	ENSG00000154678	ENSMUSG00000004347
UniProt	Q14123	Q64338
RefSeq (mRNA)	NM_001191056; NM_001191057; NM_001191058; NM_001191059; NM_005020 NM_001322055; NM_001322056; NM_001322057; NM_001322058; NM_001322059	NM_001025568; NM_001159952; NM_001159953; NM_001159955; NM_001159956 NM_001159957; NM_001159960; NM_011054; NM_001355475
RefSeq (protein)	NP_001177985; NP_001177986; NP_001177987; NP_001177988; NP_001308984 NP_001308985; NP_001308986; NP_001308987; NP_001308988; NP_005011	NP_001020739; NP_001153424; NP_001153425; NP_001153427; NP_001153428 NP_001153429; NP_001153432; NP_035184; NP_001342404
Location (UCSC)	Chr 7: 31.75 – 32.43 Mb	Chr 6: 56.05 – 56.63 Mb
PubMed search
- Wikidata
View/Edit Human	View/Edit Mouse

Calcium/calmodulin-dependent 3',5'-cyclic nucleotide phosphodiesterase 1C is an enzyme that in humans is encoded by the PDE1C gene.
