= Phosphodiesterase =

Class of enzymes

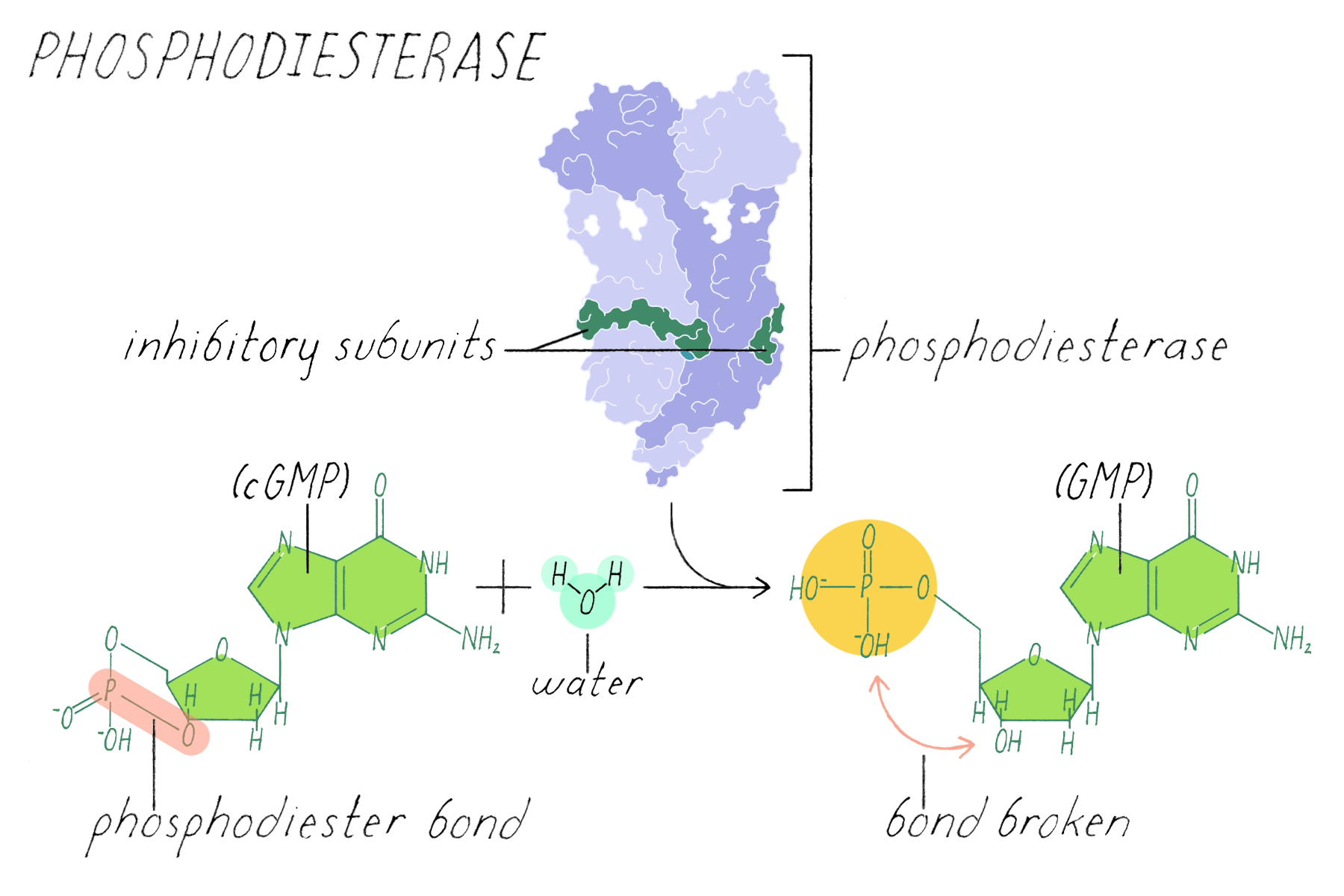
An enzyme that breaks a phosphodiester bond. A key function of this enzyme is regulating the levels of cyclic nucleotide molecules in the cell (cAMP, cGMP, etc.).

cGMP

cAMP

A phosphodiesterase (PDE) is an enzyme that breaks a phosphodiester bond. Usually, phosphodiesterase refers to cyclic nucleotide phosphodiesterases, which have great clinical significance and are described below. However, there are many other families of phosphodiesterases, including phospholipases C and D, autotaxin, sphingomyelin phosphodiesterase, DNases, RNases, and restriction endonucleases (which all break the phosphodiester backbone of DNA or RNA), as well as numerous less-well-characterized small-molecule phosphodiesterases.

The cyclic nucleotide phosphodiesterases comprise a group of enzymes that degrade the phosphodiester bond in the second messenger molecules cAMP and cGMP. They regulate the localization, duration, and amplitude of cyclic nucleotide signaling within subcellular domains. PDEs are therefore important regulators of signal transduction mediated by these second messenger molecules.

== History ==
These multiple forms (isoforms or subtypes) of phosphodiesterase were isolated from rat brain using polyacrylamide gel electrophoresis in the early 1970s by Weiss and coworkers, and were soon afterward shown to be selectively inhibited by a variety of drugs in brain and other tissues, also by Weiss and coworkers.

The potential for selective phosphodiesterase inhibitors to be used as therapeutic agents was hypothesized in the 1970s by Weiss and coworkers. This prediction has now come to pass in a variety of fields (e.g. sildenafil as a PDE5 inhibitor and Rolipram as a PDE4 inhibitor).

== Nomenclature and classification ==
The PDE nomenclature signifies the PDE family with an Arabic numeral, then a capital letter denotes the gene in that family, and a second and final Arabic numeral then indicates the splice variant derived from a single gene (e.g., PDE1C3: family 1, gene C, splicing variant 3).

The superfamily of PDE enzymes is classified into 11 families, namely PDE1-PDE11, in mammals. The classification is based on:

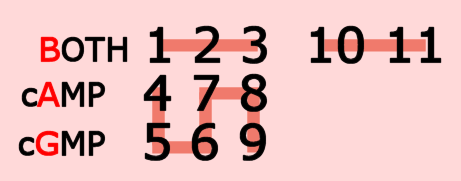
PDE substrate specificities by enzyme family. Both means it hydrolyzes both cAMP and cGMP.

- amino acid sequences
- substrate specificities
- regulatory properties
- pharmacological properties
- tissue distribution

Different PDEs of the same family are functionally related despite the fact that their amino acid sequences can show considerable divergence. PDEs have different substrate specificities. Some are cAMP-selective hydrolases (PDE4, 7 and 8); others are cGMP-selective (PDE5, 6, and 9). Others can hydrolyse both cAMP and cGMP (PDE1, 2, 3, 10, and 11). PDE3 is sometimes referred to as cGMP-inhibited phosphodiesterase. Although PDE2 can hydrolyze both cyclic nucleotides, binding of cGMP to the regulatory GAF-B domain will increase cAMP affinity and hydrolysis to the detriment of cGMP. This mechanism, as well as others, allows for cross-regulation of the cAMP and cGMP pathways. PDE12 cleaves 2',5'-phosphodiester bond linking adenosines of the 5'-triphosphorylated oligoadenylates. PDE12 is not a member of the cyclic nucleotide phosphodiesterase superfamily that contains PDE1 through PDE11.

== Clinical significance ==
Phosphodiesterase enzymes have been shown to be different in different types of cells, including normal and leukemic lymphocytes and are often targets for pharmacological inhibition due to their unique tissue distribution, structural properties, and functional properties.

PDE inhibitors can prolong or enhance the effects of physiological processes mediated by cAMP or cGMP by inhibition of their degradation by PDE.

Sildenafil (Viagra) is an inhibitor of cGMP-specific phosphodiesterase type 5, which enhances the vasodilatory effects of cGMP in the corpus cavernosum and is used to treat erectile dysfunction. Sildenafil is also currently being investigated for its myo- and cardioprotective effects, with particular interest being given to the compound's therapeutic value in the treatment of Duchenne muscular dystrophy and benign prostatic hyperplasia.

Paraxanthine, the main metabolite of caffeine, is another cGMP-specific phosphodiesterase inhibitor which inhibits PDE9, a cGMP preferring phosphodiesterase. PDE9 is expressed as high as PDE5 in the corpus cavernosum.

=== Pharmacological effect of PDE inhibitors ===
PDE inhibitors have been identified as new potential therapeutics in areas such as pulmonary arterial hypertension, coronary heart disease, dementia, depression, asthma, COPD, protozoal infections (including malaria) and schizophrenia.

PDE also are important in seizure incidence. For example, PDE compromised the antiepileptic activity of adenosine. In addition, using of a PDE inhibitor (pentoxifylline) in pentylenetetrazole-induced seizure indicated the antiepileptic effect by increasing the time latency to seizure incidence and decreasing the seizure duration in vivo.

Cilostazol (Pletal) inhibits PDE3. This inhibition allows red blood cells to be more able to bend. This is useful in conditions such as intermittent claudication, as the cells can maneuver through constricted veins and arteries more easily.

Dipyridamole inhibits PDE-3 and PDE-5. This leads to intraplatelet accumulation of cAMP and/or cGMP, inhibiting platelet aggregation.

Zaprinast inhibits the growth of asexual blood-stage malaria parasites (Plasmodium falciparum) in vitro with an ED_{50} value of 35 μM, and inhibits PfPDE1, a P. falciparum cGMP-specific phosphodiesterase, with an IC_{50} value of 3.8 μM.

Xanthines such as caffeine and theobromine are cAMP-phosphodiesterase inhibitors. However, the inhibitory effect of xanthines on phosphodiesterases are only seen at dosages higher than what people normally consume.

Sildenafil, Tadalafil and Vardenafil are PDE-5 inhibitors and are widely used in the treatment of erectile dysfunction.

== Other applications ==
As of 2020 a PDE was found to break down and release human body grime found on laundry. With the help of this newly discovered nuclease, the yellow stains and odors, that normally remain on clothes with classical detergents, can easily be removed.
