= Rhodopsin =

Light-sensitive receptor protein

RHO
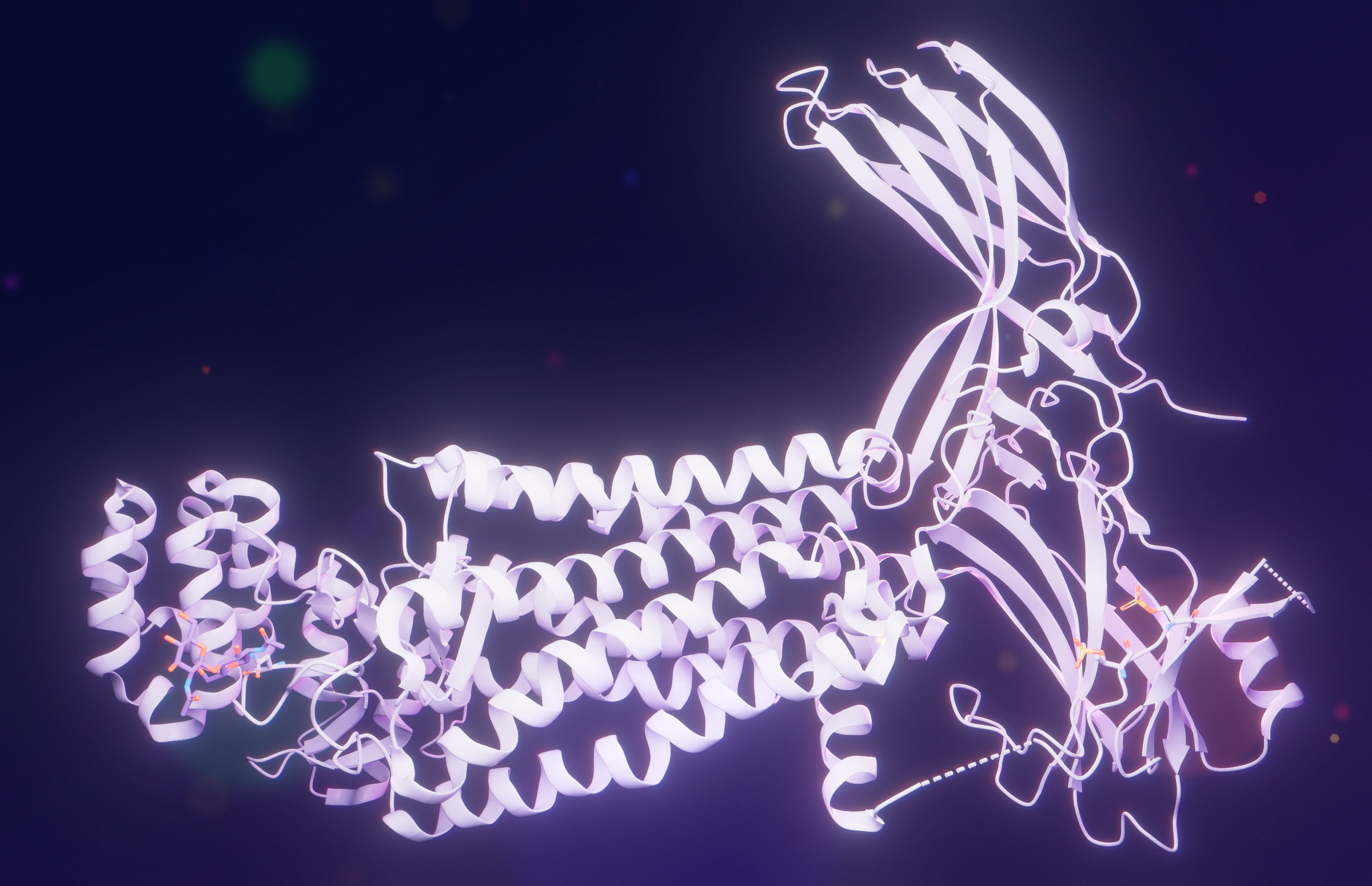

Identifiers
- Aliases: RHO, CSNBAD1, OPN2, RP4, rhodopsin, Rhodopsin, visual purple
- External IDs: OMIM: 180380; MGI: 97914; GeneCards: RHO
Available structures
PDB	Ortholog search: PDBe RCSB
PDB	List of PDB id codes 4ZWJ, 5DGY

Gene location (Human)
Chr.	Chromosome 3 (human)
Band	3q22.1	Start	129,528,639 bp
Band	3q22.1	End	129,535,344 bp

Gene location (Mouse)
Chr.	Chromosome 6 (mouse)
Band	6 E3|6 53.72 cM	Start	115,908,709 bp
Band	6 E3|6 53.72 cM	End	115,916,997 bp
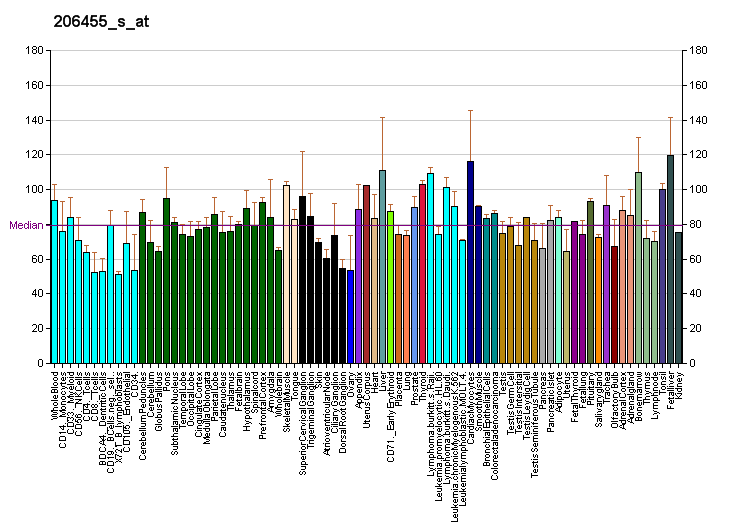

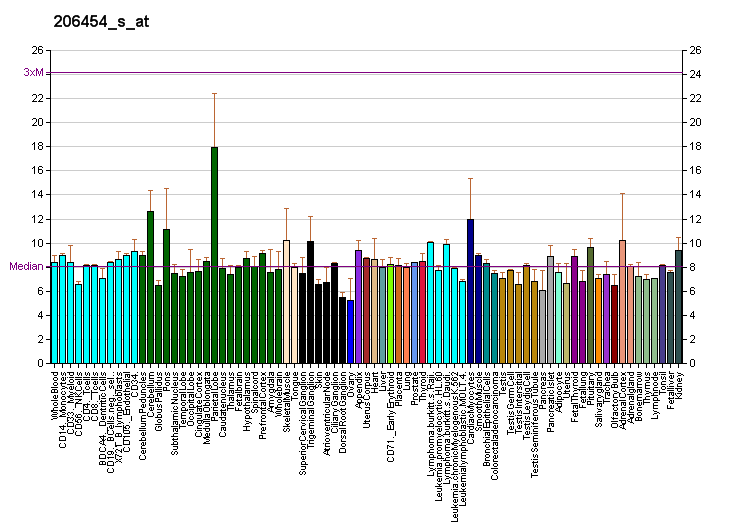
RNA expression pattern
Bgee	Human / Mouse (ortholog); Top expressed in: choroid; buccal mucosa cell; testicle; retina; retinal pigment epithelium; secondary oocyte; lower lobe of lung; pars reticulata; superior frontal gyrus; occipital lobe / Top expressed in: neural layer of retina; retinal pigment epithelium; epithelium of lens; ciliary body; iris; corneal stroma; conjunctival fornix; gastrula; outer nuclear layer; tibiofemoral joint; More reference expression data
BioGPS	More reference expression data
Gene ontology
Molecular function	signal transducer activity; metal ion binding; photoreceptor activity; protein binding; G protein-coupled receptor activity; 11-cis retinal binding; G protein-coupled photoreceptor activity
Cellular component	Golgi-associated vesicle membrane; Golgi apparatus; Golgi membrane; photoreceptor outer segment; cell-cell junction; integral component of plasma membrane; membrane; photoreceptor inner segment; ciliary membrane; plasma membrane; photoreceptor inner segment membrane; photoreceptor outer segment membrane; integral component of membrane; photoreceptor disc membrane; cell projection
Biological process	retina development in camera-type eye; sensory perception of light stimulus; signal transduction; response to stimulus; detection of light stimulus; absorption of visible light; cellular response to light stimulus; protein phosphorylation; response to light stimulus; regulation of rhodopsin mediated signaling pathway; retinoid metabolic process; phototransduction; phototransduction of visible light; photoreceptor cell maintenance; visual perception; G protein-coupled receptor signaling pathway; rhodopsin mediated signaling pathway
Sources:Amigo / QuickGO
Orthologs
Databases	NCBI: entry; OMA: entry
Species	Human	Mouse
Entrez	6010	212541
Ensembl	ENSG00000163914	ENSMUSG00000030324
UniProt	P08100	P15409
RefSeq (mRNA)	NM_000539	NM_145383
RefSeq (protein)	NP_000530	NP_663358
Location (UCSC)	Chr 3: 129.53 – 129.54 Mb	Chr 6: 115.91 – 115.92 Mb
PubMed search
- Wikidata
View/Edit Human	View/Edit Mouse

Rhodopsin, also known as visual purple, is a protein encoded by the RHO gene and a G-protein-coupled receptor (GPCR). It is a light-sensitive receptor protein that triggers visual phototransduction in rod cells. Rhodopsin mediates dim light vision and thus is extremely sensitive to light. When rhodopsin is exposed to light, it immediately photobleaches. In humans, it is fully regenerated in about 30 minutes, after which the rods are more sensitive. Defects in the rhodopsin gene cause eye diseases such as retinitis pigmentosa and congenital stationary night blindness.

== History ==
Rhodopsin was discovered by Franz Christian Boll in 1876. The name rhodopsin derives from Ancient Greek ῥόδον (rhódon) for "rose", due to its pinkish color, and ὄψις (ópsis) for "sight". It was coined in 1878 by the German physiologist Wilhelm Friedrich Kühne (1837–1900).

When George Wald discovered that rhodopsin is a holoprotein, consisting of retinal and an apoprotein, he called it opsin, which today would be described more narrowly as apo-rhodopsin. Today, the term opsin refers more broadly to the class of G-protein-coupled receptors that bind retinal and as a result become a light-sensitive photoreceptor, including all closely related proteins. (Note: Hofmann and Lamb use the term opsin in general to mean the group of opsins, however they call apo-rhodopsin in their figure 4 opsin, too.) When Wald and colleagues later isolated iodopsin from chicken retinas, thereby discovering the first known cone opsin, they called apo-iodopsin photopsin (for its relation to photopic vision) and apo-rhodopsin scotopsin (for its use in scotopic vision).

== General ==
Rhodopsin is a protein found in the outer segment discs of rod cells. It mediates scotopic vision, which is monochromatic vision in dim light. Rhodopsin most strongly absorbs green-blue light (~500 nm) and appears therefore reddish-purple, hence the archaic term "visual purple".

Several closely related opsins differ only in a few amino acids and in the wavelengths of light that they absorb most strongly. Humans have, including rhodopsin, nine opsins, as well as cryptochrome (light-sensitive, but not an opsin).

== Structure ==
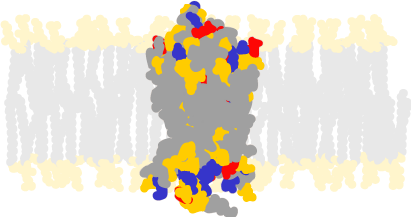
Cattle rhodopsin

Rhodopsin, like other opsins, is a G-protein-coupled receptor (GPCR). GPCRs are chemoreceptors that embed in the lipid bilayer of the cell membranes and have seven transmembrane domains forming a binding pocket for a ligand. The ligand for rhodopsin is the vitamin A-based chromophore 11-cis-retinal, which lies horizontally to the cell membrane and is covalently bound to a lysine residue (lys296) in the seventh transmembrane domain through a Schiff-base. However, 11-cis-retinal only blocks the binding pocket and does not activate rhodopsin. It is only activated when 11-cis-retinal absorbs a photon of light and isomerizes to all-trans-retinal, the receptor activating form, causing a configurational change in the rhodopsin, which activate a phototransduction cascade. Thus, a chemoreceptor is converted to a light or photo(n)receptor.

The retinal binding lysine is conserved in almost all opsins, only a few opsins having lost it during evolution. Opsins without the lysine are not light sensitive, including rhodopsin. Rhodopsin is made constitutively (continuously) active by some of those mutations even without light. Also wild-type rhodopsin is constitutively active, if no 11-cis-retinal is bound, but much less. Therefore 11-cis-retinal is an inverse agonist. Such mutations are one cause of autosomal dominant retinitis pigmentosa. Artificially, the retinal binding lysine can be shifted to other positions, even into other transmembrane domains, without changing the activity.

The rhodopsin of cattle has 348 amino acids, the retinal binding lysine being Lys296. It was the first opsin whose amino acid sequence and 3D-structure were determined. Its structure has been studied in detail by x-ray crystallography on rhodopsin crystals. Several models (e.g., the bicycle-pedal mechanism, hula-twist mechanism) attempt to explain how the retinal group can change its conformation without clashing with the enveloping rhodopsin protein pocket. Recent data support that rhodopsin is a functional monomer, instead of a dimer, which was the paradigm of G-protein-coupled receptors for many years.

Within its native membrane, rhodopsin is found at a high density facilitating its ability to capture photons. Due to its dense packing within the membrane, there is a higher chance of rhodopsin capturing photons. However, the high density also is a disadvantage when it comes to G protein signaling because the needed diffusion becomes more difficult in a crowded membrane that is packed with rhodopsin.

== Phototransduction ==
The visual cycle follows the renewal of the retinal chromophore. It runs in parallel to the phototransduction pathway.

Rhodopsin is an essential G-protein coupled receptor in phototransduction.

=== Activation ===
In rhodopsin, the aldehyde group of retinal is covalently linked to the amino group of a lysine residue on the protein in a protonated Schiff base (-NH^{+}=CH-). When rhodopsin absorbs light, its retinal cofactor isomerizes from the 11-cis to the all-trans configuration, and the protein subsequently undergoes a series of relaxations to accommodate the altered shape of the isomerized cofactor. The intermediates formed during this process were first investigated in the laboratory of George Wald, who received the Nobel prize for this research in 1967. The photoisomerization dynamics has been subsequently investigated with time-resolved IR spectroscopy and UV/Vis spectroscopy. A first photoproduct called photorhodopsin forms within 200 femtoseconds after irradiation, followed within picoseconds by a second one called bathorhodopsin with distorted all-trans bonds. This intermediate can be trapped and studied at cryogenic temperatures, and was initially referred to as prelumirhodopsin. In subsequent intermediates lumirhodopsin and metarhodopsin I, the Schiff's base linkage to all-trans retinal remains protonated, and the protein retains its reddish color. The critical change that initiates the neuronal excitation involves the conversion of metarhodopsin I to metarhodopsin II, which is associated with deprotonation of the Schiff's base and change in color from red to yellow.

=== Phototransduction cascade ===
The product of light activation, Metarhodopsin II, initiates the visual phototransduction second messenger pathway by stimulating the G-protein transducin (G_{t}), resulting in the liberation of its α subunit. This guanosine triphosphate (GTP)-bound subunit in turn activates a cGMP phosphodiesterase. The cGMP phosphodiesterase hydrolyzes (breaks down) cGMP, lowering its local concentration so it can no longer activate cGMP-dependent cation channels. This leads to the hyperpolarization of photoreceptor cells, changing the rate at which they release transmitters.

=== Deactivation ===
Meta II (metarhodopsin II) is deactivated rapidly after activating transducin by rhodopsin kinase and arrestin. Rhodopsin pigment must be regenerated for further phototransduction to occur. This means replacing all-trans-retinal with 11-cis-retinal and the decay of Meta II is crucial in this process. During the decay of Meta II, the Schiff base link that normally holds all-trans-retinal and the apoprotein opsin (aporhodopsin) is hydrolyzed and becomes Meta III. In the rod outer segment, Meta III decays into separate all-trans-retinal and opsin. A second product of Meta II decay is an all-trans-retinal opsin complex in which the all-trans-retinal has been translocated to second binding sites. Whether the Meta II decay runs into Meta III or the all-trans-retinal opsin complex seems to depend on the pH of the reaction. Higher pH tends to drive the decay reaction towards Meta III.

== Diseases of the retina ==
Mutations in the rhodopsin gene contribute majorly to various diseases of the retina such as retinitis pigmentosa. In general, the defect rhodopsin aggregates with ubiquitin in inclusion bodies, disrupts the intermediate filament network, and impairs the ability of the cell to degrade non-functioning proteins, which leads to photoreceptor apoptosis. Other mutations on rhodopsin lead to X-linked congenital stationary night blindness, mainly due to constitutive activation, when the mutations occur around the chromophore binding pocket of rhodopsin. Several other pathological states relating to rhodopsin have been discovered including poor post-Golgi trafficking, dysregulative activation, rod outer segment instability and arrestin binding.

== See also ==
- Bacteriorhodopsin, used in some halobacteria as a light-driven proton pump.
