= PDE9 =

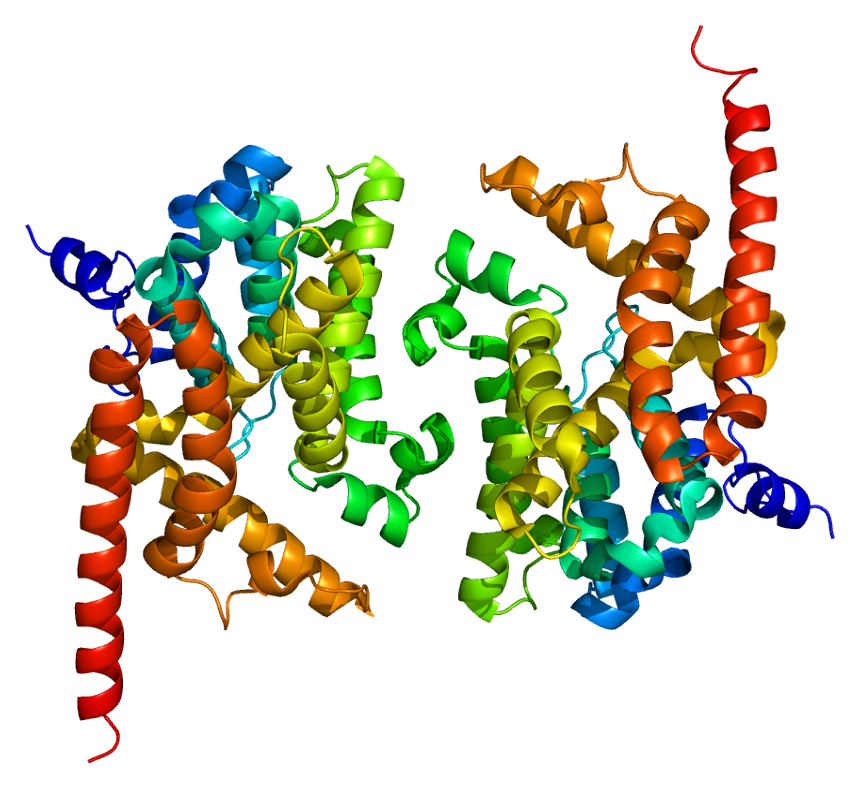
Structure of the PDE9A protein. Based on PyMOL rendering of PDB 2hd1.

Phosphodiesterase type 9 (PDE9) is a type of phosphodiesterase enzyme.

Some inhibitors include BAY 73-6691, PF-04447943, and paraxanthine.
