= PDE7B =

Protein-coding gene in the species Homo sapiens

Available structures
PDB	Ortholog search: PDBe RCSB
PDB	List of PDB id codes 1LXW

Identifiers
- Aliases: PDE7B, bA472E5.1, phosphodiesterase 7B
- External IDs: OMIM: 604645; MGI: 1352752; HomoloGene: 32194; GeneCards: PDE7B; OMA:PDE7B - orthologs

Gene location (Human)
Chr.	Chromosome 6 (human)
Band	6q23.3	Start	135,851,701 bp
Band	6q23.3	End	136,195,574 bp

Gene location (Mouse)
Chr.	Chromosome 10 (mouse)
Band	10|10 A3	Start	20,273,750 bp
Band	10|10 A3	End	20,600,824 bp
RNA expression pattern
Bgee	Human / Mouse (ortholog); Top expressed in: germinal epithelium; Achilles tendon; external globus pallidus; nucleus accumbens; middle temporal gyrus; buccal mucosa cell; tibia; caudate nucleus; putamen; endothelial cell / Top expressed in: olfactory tubercle; globus pallidus; olfactory epithelium; lateral geniculate nucleus; medial dorsal nucleus; nucleus accumbens; vas deferens; median eminence; medial geniculate nucleus; extraocular muscle; More reference expression data
BioGPS	n/a
Gene ontology
Molecular function	3',5'-cyclic-AMP phosphodiesterase activity; phosphoric diester hydrolase activity; hydrolase activity; 3',5'-cyclic-nucleotide phosphodiesterase activity; metal ion binding
Cellular component	cytosol
Biological process	cAMP catabolic process; signal transduction; chemical synaptic transmission; G protein-coupled receptor signaling pathway
Sources:Amigo / QuickGO
Orthologs
Species	Human	Mouse
Entrez	27115	29863
Ensembl	ENSG00000171408	ENSMUSG00000019990
UniProt	Q9NP56	Q9QXQ1
RefSeq (mRNA)	NM_018945	NM_013875; NM_001347366
RefSeq (protein)	NP_061818	NP_001334295; NP_038903
Location (UCSC)	Chr 6: 135.85 – 136.2 Mb	Chr 10: 20.27 – 20.6 Mb
PubMed search
- Wikidata
View/Edit Human	View/Edit Mouse

PDE7B is a mammalian gene that encodes a 3'5'-cyclic nucleotide phosphodiesterase (PDE) that converts 3'5'-cyclic adenosine monophosphate (cAMP) to 5'AMP as part of cyclic nucleotide signaling pathways. There are 21 PDE genes in mammals that are pharmacologically grouped into 11 families based on their biochemical characteristics and sequence conservation. The PDE7 family is composed of PDEs encoded by two genes, PDE7A and PDE7B. These PDEs are highly specific for cAMP relative to cGMP.
