= PDE8A =

Protein-coding gene in the species Homo sapiens

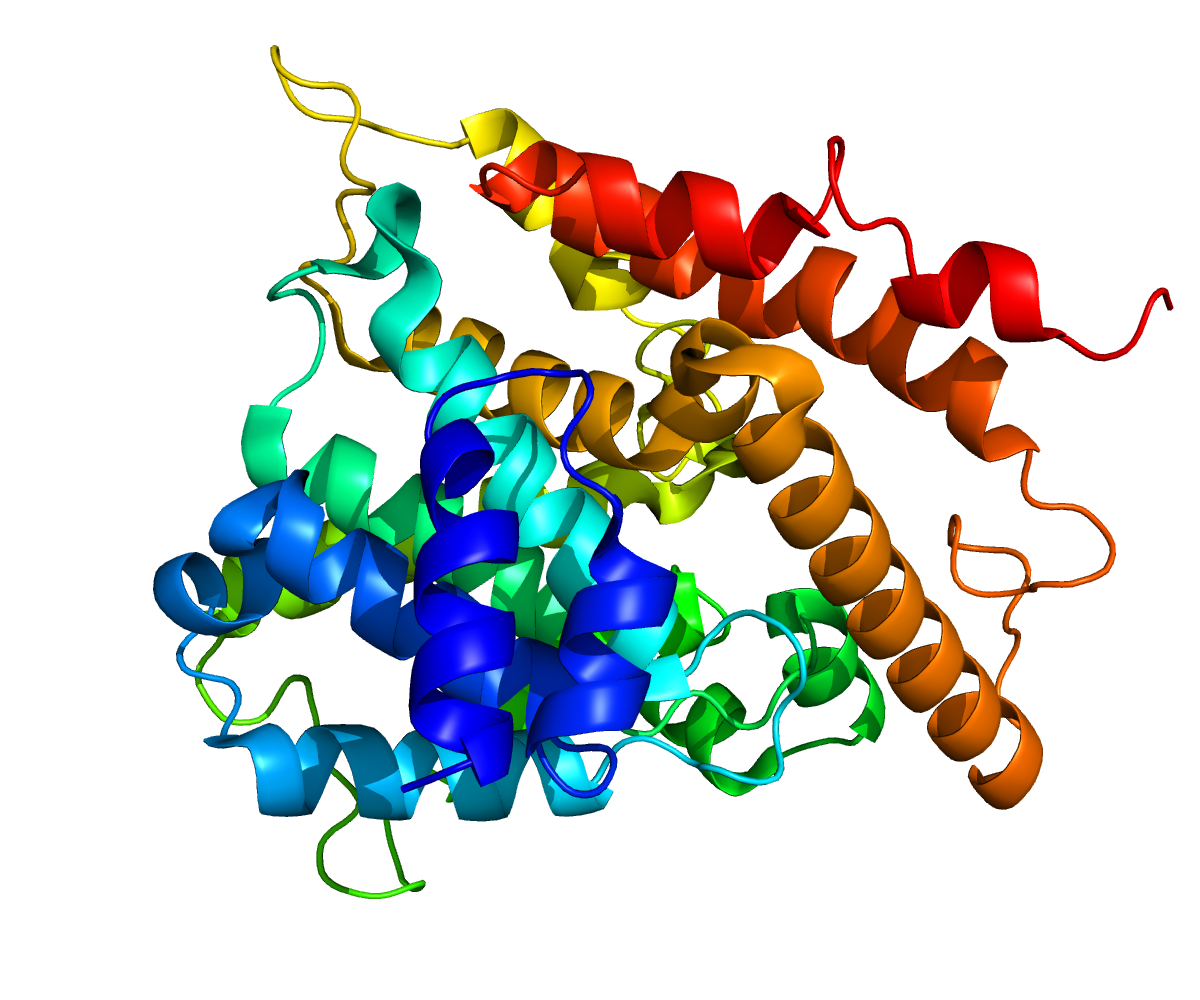
Available structures
PDB	Ortholog search: PDBe RCSB
PDB	List of PDB id codes 3ECM, 3ECN

Identifiers
- Aliases: PDE8A, HsT19550, phosphodiesterase 8A
- External IDs: OMIM: 602972; MGI: 1277116; HomoloGene: 1957; GeneCards: PDE8A; OMA:PDE8A - orthologs
- EC number: 3.1.4.53

Gene location (Human)
Chr.	Chromosome 15 (human)
Band	15q25.3	Start	84,980,440 bp
Band	15q25.3	End	85,139,145 bp

Gene location (Mouse)
Chr.	Chromosome 7 (mouse)
Band	7|7 D3	Start	80,863,344 bp
Band	7|7 D3	End	80,984,281 bp
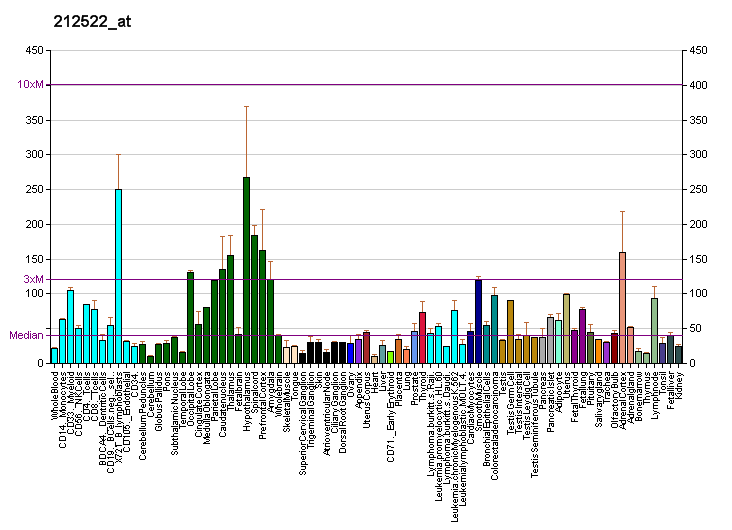

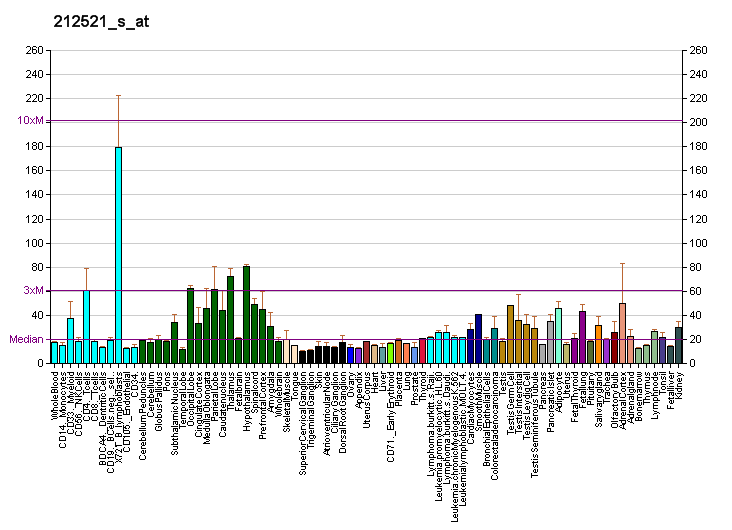
RNA expression pattern
Bgee	Human / Mouse (ortholog); Top expressed in: corpus callosum; middle frontal gyrus; inferior ganglion of vagus nerve; inferior olivary nucleus; external globus pallidus; subthalamic nucleus; mucosa of colon; pars reticulata; mucosa of sigmoid colon; palpebral conjunctiva / Top expressed in: seminiferous tubule; cumulus cell; spermatocyte; lumbar subsegment of spinal cord; lacrimal gland; spermatid; parotid gland; calvaria; pyloric antrum; epithelium of stomach; More reference expression data
BioGPS	More reference expression data
Gene ontology
Molecular function	phosphoric diester hydrolase activity; hydrolase activity; 3',5'-cyclic-nucleotide phosphodiesterase activity; metal ion binding; 3',5'-cyclic-AMP phosphodiesterase activity; kinase binding; 3',5'-cyclic-GMP phosphodiesterase activity
Cellular component	cytosol; extracellular exosome
Biological process	cyclic nucleotide metabolic process; cAMP catabolic process; regulation of transcription, DNA-templated; signal transduction; positive regulation of protein phosphorylation; negative regulation of cell death; positive regulation of ERK1 and ERK2 cascade; cellular response to epidermal growth factor stimulus; negative regulation of hydrogen peroxide-induced cell death; G protein-coupled receptor signaling pathway
Sources:Amigo / QuickGO
Orthologs
Species	Human	Mouse
Entrez	5151	18584
Ensembl	ENSG00000073417	ENSMUSG00000025584
UniProt	O60658	O88502
RefSeq (mRNA)	NM_001243137; NM_002605; NM_173454; NM_173455; NM_173456 NM_173457	NM_008803
RefSeq (protein)	NP_001230066; NP_002596; NP_775656	NP_032829
Location (UCSC)	Chr 15: 84.98 – 85.14 Mb	Chr 7: 80.86 – 80.98 Mb
PubMed search
- Wikidata
View/Edit Human	View/Edit Mouse

High affinity cAMP-specific and IBMX-insensitive 3',5'-cyclic phosphodiesterase 8A is an enzyme that in humans is encoded by the PDE8A gene. Work by Sebastiaan Bol et al. showed that 5 different transcript variants and their corresponding isoforms are expressed in human macrophages, and suggests that this protein may be required by HIV-1 for its replication.
