= PDE1A =

Protein-coding gene in the species Homo sapiens

Available structures
| PDB | Ortholog search: PDBe RCSB |
| PDB | List of PDB id codes 1LXQ |

Identifiers
- Aliases: PDE1A, CAM-PDE-1A, HCAM-1, HCAM1, HSphosphodiesterase 1A, CAM-PDE 1A
- External IDs: OMIM: 171890; MGI: 1201792; HomoloGene: 21043; GeneCards: PDE1A; OMA:PDE1A - orthologs

Gene location (Human)
| Chr. | Chromosome 2 (human) |
| Band | 2q32.1 | Start | 182,139,968 bp |
| Band | 2q32.1 | End | 182,523,359 bp |

Gene location (Mouse)
| Chr. | Chromosome 2 (mouse) |
| Band | 2|2 C3 | Start | 79,664,797 bp |
| Band | 2|2 C3 | End | 79,959,802 bp |
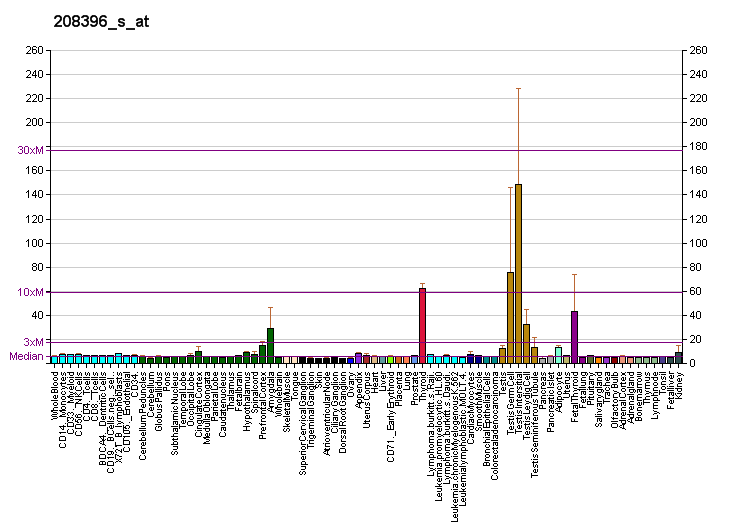
RNA expression pattern
| Bgee | Human / Mouse (ortholog); Top expressed in: sperm; Brodmann area 23; buccal mucosa cell; middle temporal gyrus; renal medulla; entorhinal cortex; parietal lobe; postcentral gyrus; superior frontal gyrus; cerebellar cortex / Top expressed in: spermatid; dentate gyrus of hippocampal formation granule cell; seminiferous tubule; right kidney; primary visual cortex; superior frontal gyrus; subiculum; anterior amygdaloid area; primary motor cortex; Region I of hippocampus proper; More reference expression data |
| BioGPS | More reference expression data |
Gene ontology
| Molecular function | phosphoric diester hydrolase activity; calmodulin-dependent cyclic-nucleotide phosphodiesterase activity; hydrolase activity; 3',5'-cyclic-nucleotide phosphodiesterase activity; metal ion binding; calmodulin binding; calcium- and calmodulin-regulated 3',5'-cyclic-GMP phosphodiesterase activity; cGMP binding; 3',5'-cyclic-AMP phosphodiesterase activity; 3',5'-cyclic-GMP phosphodiesterase activity |
| Cellular component | cytosol; cytoplasm; nucleus; soma |
| Biological process | cGMP catabolic process; cAMP catabolic process; signal transduction; regulation of smooth muscle cell apoptotic process; regulation of smooth muscle cell proliferation; G protein-coupled receptor signaling pathway |
Sources:Amigo / QuickGO
Orthologs
| Species | Human | Mouse |
| Entrez | 5136 | 18573 |
| Ensembl | ENSG00000115252 | ENSMUSG00000059173 |
| UniProt | P54750; Q9Y633 | Q61481 |
| RefSeq (mRNA) | NM_001003683; NM_001258312; NM_001258313; NM_001258314; NM_005019 NM_001363871; NM_001395258; NM_001395259; NM_001395260; NM_001395261; NM_001395262; NM_001395263; NM_001395264; NM_001395265; NM_001395266; NM_001395267; NM_001395268; NM_001395269 | NM_001009978; NM_001009979; NM_001159582; NM_016744; NM_001355140 NM_001355141; NM_001355142; NM_001355143; NM_001355144 |
| RefSeq (protein) | NP_001003683; NP_001245241; NP_001245242; NP_001245243; NP_005010 NP_001350800; NP_001245241.1 | NP_001009978; NP_001009979; NP_001153054; NP_058024; NP_001342069 NP_001342070; NP_001342071; NP_001342073 |
| Location (UCSC) | Chr 2: 182.14 – 182.52 Mb | Chr 2: 79.66 – 79.96 Mb |
| PubMed search |
- Wikidata
| View/Edit Human | View/Edit Mouse |

Calcium/calmodulin-dependent 3',5'-cyclic nucleotide phosphodiesterase 1A is an enzyme that in humans is encoded by the PDE1A gene.
