= PDE11A =

Protein-coding gene in the species Homo sapiens

Identifiers
- Aliases: PDE11A, PPNAD2, phosphodiesterase 11A
- External IDs: OMIM: 604961; MGI: 3036251; GeneCards: PDE11A
Enzyme activity
EC #	BRENDA	ExPASy	KEGG	MetaCyc
3.1.4.35	↗	↗	↗	↗
3.1.4.53	↗	↗	↗	↗

Gene location (Mouse)
Chr.	Chromosome 2 (mouse)
Band	2|2 C3	Start	75,819,485 bp
Band	2|2 C3	End	76,169,118 bp
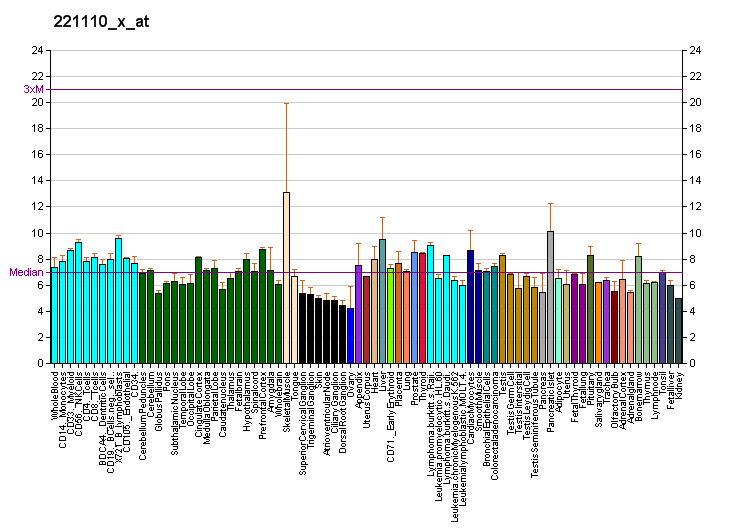
RNA expression pattern
Bgee	Human / Mouse (ortholog); Top expressed in: deltoid muscle; quadriceps femoris muscle; vastus lateralis muscle; liver; gastrocnemius muscle; prostate; biceps brachii; right lobe of liver; tibialis anterior muscle; tibia / Top expressed in: hippocampus proper; dentate gyrus of hippocampal formation granule cell; embryo; ileum; primary visual cortex; midbrain tegmentum; jejunum; Cortex of frontal lobe; white adipose tissue; cerebellar cortex; More reference expression data
BioGPS	More reference expression data
Gene ontology
Molecular function	phosphoric diester hydrolase activity; catalytic activity; 3',5'-cyclic-nucleotide phosphodiesterase activity; hydrolase activity; metal ion binding; cGMP-stimulated cyclic-nucleotide phosphodiesterase activity; 3',5'-cyclic-AMP phosphodiesterase activity; 3',5'-cyclic-GMP phosphodiesterase activity; cyclic-nucleotide phosphodiesterase activity; cGMP binding
Cellular component	cytoplasm; cytosol; cellular component
Biological process	metabolism; signal transduction; G protein-coupled receptor signaling pathway; negative regulation of cGMP-mediated signaling; negative regulation of cAMP-mediated signaling
Sources:Amigo / QuickGO
Orthologs
Databases	NCBI: entry
Species	Human	Mouse
Entrez	50940	241489
Ensembl	n/a	ENSMUSG00000075270
UniProt	Q9HCR9	P0C1Q2
RefSeq (mRNA)	NM_016953; NM_001077196; NM_001077197; NM_001077358	NM_001081033
RefSeq (protein)	NP_001070664; NP_001070665; NP_001070826; NP_058649	NP_001074502
Location (UCSC)	n/a	Chr 2: 75.82 – 76.17 Mb
PubMed search
- Wikidata
View/Edit Human	View/Edit Mouse

Dual 3',5'-cyclic-AMP and -GMP phosphodiesterase 11A is an enzyme that in humans is encoded by the PDE11A gene.

The 3',5'-cyclic nucleotides cAMP and cGMP function as second messengers in a wide variety of signal transduction pathways. 3',5'-cyclic nucleotide phosphodiesterases (PDEs) catalyze the hydrolysis of cAMP and cGMP to the corresponding 5'-monophosphates and provide a mechanism to downregulate cAMP and cGMP signaling. This gene encodes a member of the PDE protein superfamily. Mutations in this gene are a cause of Cushing's disease and adrenocortical hyperplasia. Multiple transcript variants encoding different isoforms have been found for this gene.

== Inhibitors ==
- BC11-38
