= PDE6G =

Protein-coding gene in the species Homo sapiens

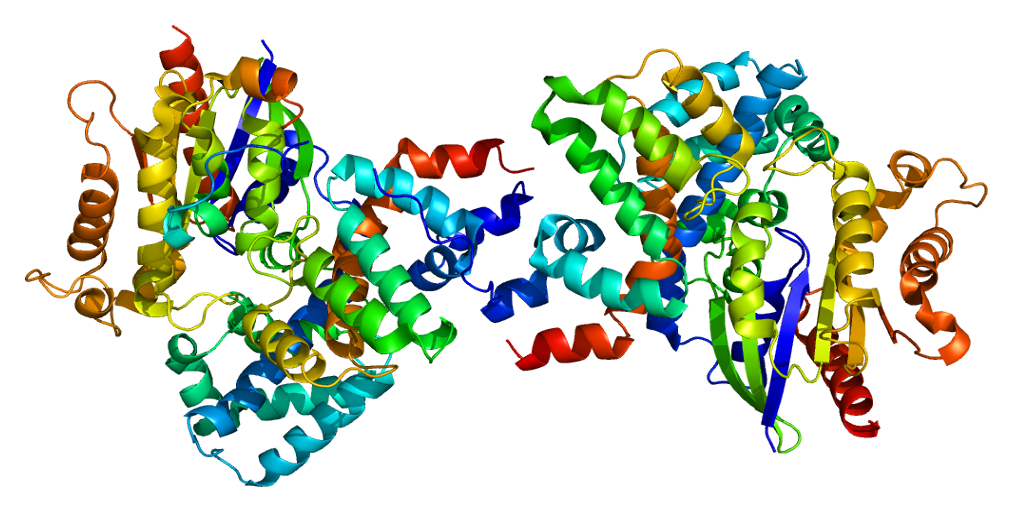

Identifiers
- Aliases: PDE6G, PDEG, RP57, phosphodiesterase 6G
- External IDs: OMIM: 180073; MGI: 97526; GeneCards: PDE6G
Available structures
PDB	Ortholog search: PDBe RCSB
PDB	List of PDB id codes 3JWR

Gene location (Human)
Chr.	Chromosome 17 (human)
Band	17q25.3	Start	81,650,459 bp
Band	17q25.3	End	81,663,112 bp

Gene location (Mouse)
Chr.	Chromosome 11 (mouse)
Band	11 E2|11 84.14 cM	Start	120,338,431 bp
Band	11 E2|11 84.14 cM	End	120,344,326 bp
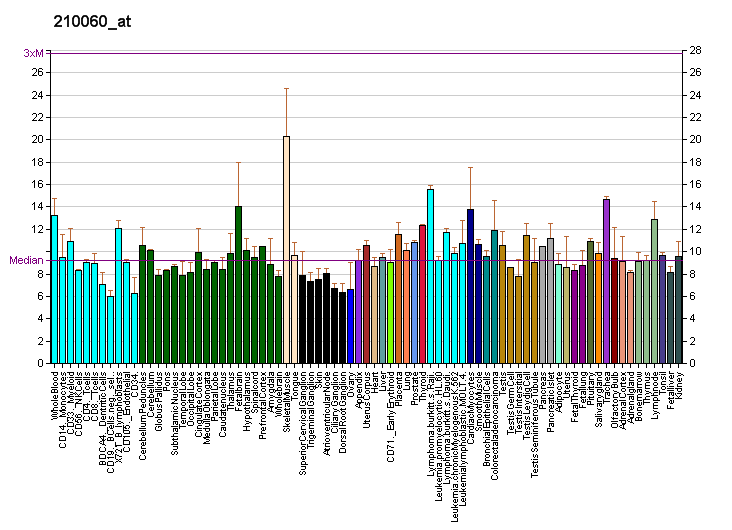
RNA expression pattern
Bgee	Human / Mouse (ortholog); Top expressed in: testicle; gonad; granulocyte; lymph node; spleen; retinal pigment epithelium; monocyte; secondary oocyte; blood; bone marrow cell / Top expressed in: neural layer of retina; epithelium of lens; pineal gland; retinal pigment epithelium; corneal stroma; gastrula; iris; outer nuclear layer; right ventricle; ciliary body; More reference expression data
BioGPS	More reference expression data
Gene ontology
Molecular function	enzyme inhibitor activity; spectrin binding; cGMP binding; protein binding; 3',5'-cyclic-GMP phosphodiesterase activity; 3',5'-cyclic-nucleotide phosphodiesterase activity; hydrolase activity
Cellular component	plasma membrane; photoreceptor disc membrane; photoreceptor outer segment membrane
Biological process	positive regulation of G protein-coupled receptor signaling pathway; positive regulation of epidermal growth factor receptor signaling pathway; visual perception; response to stimulus; regulation of rhodopsin mediated signaling pathway; negative regulation of catalytic activity; Wnt signaling pathway, calcium modulating pathway; rhodopsin mediated signaling pathway
Sources:Amigo / QuickGO
Orthologs
Databases	NCBI: entry; OMA: entry
Species	Human	Mouse
Entrez	5148	18588
Ensembl	ENSG00000185527	ENSMUSG00000025386
UniProt	P18545	P09174
RefSeq (mRNA)	NM_002602; NM_001365724; NM_001365725	NM_012065
RefSeq (protein)	NP_002593; NP_001352653; NP_001352654	NP_036197
Location (UCSC)	Chr 17: 81.65 – 81.66 Mb	Chr 11: 120.34 – 120.34 Mb
PubMed search
- Wikidata
View/Edit Human	View/Edit Mouse

Retinal rod rhodopsin-sensitive cGMP 3',5'-cyclic phosphodiesterase subunit gamma is an enzyme that in humans is encoded by the PDE6G gene.

== Interactions ==
PDE6G has been shown to interact with Beta adrenergic receptor kinase and Src.
