= PDE2A =

Protein-coding gene in the species Homo sapiens

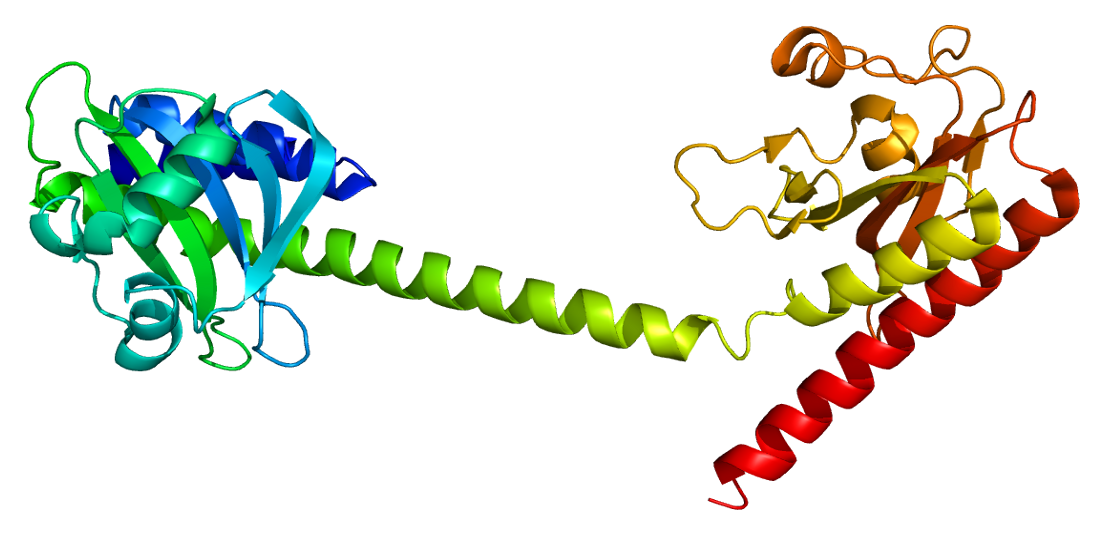
Available structures
PDB	Ortholog search: PDBe RCSB
PDB	List of PDB id codes 1Z1L, 3IBJ, 3ITM, 3ITU, 4C1I, 4D08, 4D09, 4HTX, 4HTZ, 4JIB

Identifiers
- Aliases: PDE2A, CGS-PDE, PDE2A1, PED2A4, cGSPDE, phosphodiesterase 2A, IDDPADS
- External IDs: OMIM: 602658; MGI: 2446107; HomoloGene: 1952; GeneCards: PDE2A; OMA:PDE2A - orthologs

Gene location (Human)
Chr.	Chromosome 11 (human)
Band	11q13.4	Start	72,576,141 bp
Band	11q13.4	End	72,674,591 bp
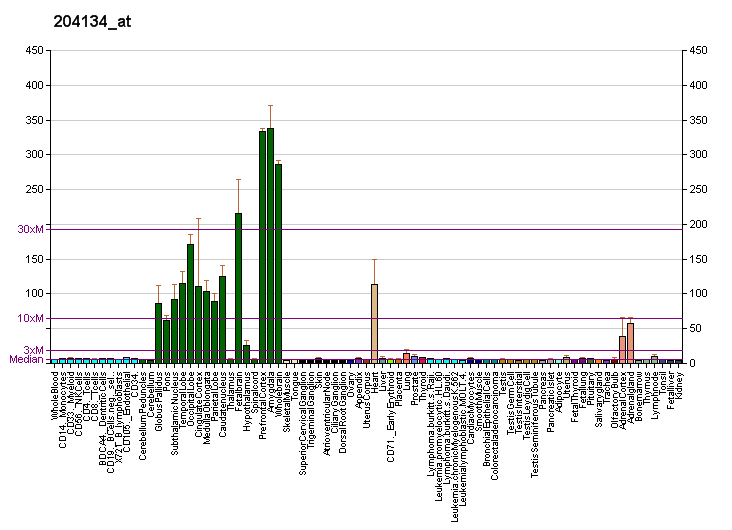
RNA expression pattern
Bgee	Human / Mouse (ortholog); Top expressed in: spleen; right frontal lobe; prefrontal cortex; dorsolateral prefrontal cortex; cingulate gyrus; anterior cingulate cortex; Brodmann area 9; orbitofrontal cortex; Region I of hippocampus proper; nucleus accumbens / n/a; More reference expression data
BioGPS	More reference expression data
Gene ontology
Molecular function	nucleotide binding; 3',5'-cyclic-nucleotide phosphodiesterase activity; calcium channel activity; cGMP binding; metal ion binding; cyclic-nucleotide phosphodiesterase activity; protein binding; phosphoric diester hydrolase activity; TPR domain binding; hydrolase activity; cGMP-stimulated cyclic-nucleotide phosphodiesterase activity; cAMP binding; protein homodimerization activity; 3',5'-cyclic-AMP phosphodiesterase activity; 3',5'-cyclic-GMP phosphodiesterase activity; identical protein binding; magnesium ion binding; zinc ion binding; phosphate ion binding
Cellular component	cytoplasm; cytosol; Golgi apparatus; membrane; plasma membrane; endoplasmic reticulum; mitochondrion; perinuclear region of cytoplasm; presynaptic membrane; nucleus; mitochondrial outer membrane; mitochondrial inner membrane; mitochondrial matrix
Biological process	establishment of endothelial barrier; cellular response to transforming growth factor beta stimulus; positive regulation of inflammatory response; cellular response to cGMP; negative regulation of transcription by RNA polymerase II; monocyte differentiation; cGMP-mediated signaling; cellular response to macrophage colony-stimulating factor stimulus; cellular response to mechanical stimulus; positive regulation of vascular permeability; cellular response to granulocyte macrophage colony-stimulating factor stimulus; cAMP-mediated signaling; signal transduction; negative regulation of vascular permeability; cGMP catabolic process; cAMP catabolic process; calcium ion transmembrane transport; G protein-coupled receptor signaling pathway; negative regulation of cAMP-mediated signaling; cellular response to cAMP; cellular response to 2,3,7,8-tetrachlorodibenzodioxine; adenylate cyclase-inhibiting G protein-coupled receptor signaling pathway; positive regulation of gene expression; negative regulation of cGMP-mediated signaling; regulation of mitochondrion organization; heart valve development; ventricular septum development; aorta development
Sources:Amigo / QuickGO
Orthologs
Species	Human	Mouse
Entrez	5138	207728
Ensembl	ENSG00000186642	ENSMUSG00000030653
UniProt	O00408	Q922S4
RefSeq (mRNA)	NM_001143839; NM_001146209; NM_001243784; NM_002599	NM_001008548; NM_001143848; NM_001143849; NM_001243757; NM_001243758
RefSeq (protein)	NP_001137311; NP_001139681; NP_001230713; NP_002590	NP_001008548; NP_001137320; NP_001137321; NP_001230686; NP_001230687
Location (UCSC)	Chr 11: 72.58 – 72.67 Mb	n/a
PubMed search
- Wikidata
View/Edit Human	View/Edit Mouse

cGMP-dependent 3',5'-cyclic phosphodiesterase is an enzyme that in humans is encoded by the PDE2A gene.
