= PDE6A =

Protein-coding gene in the species Homo sapiens

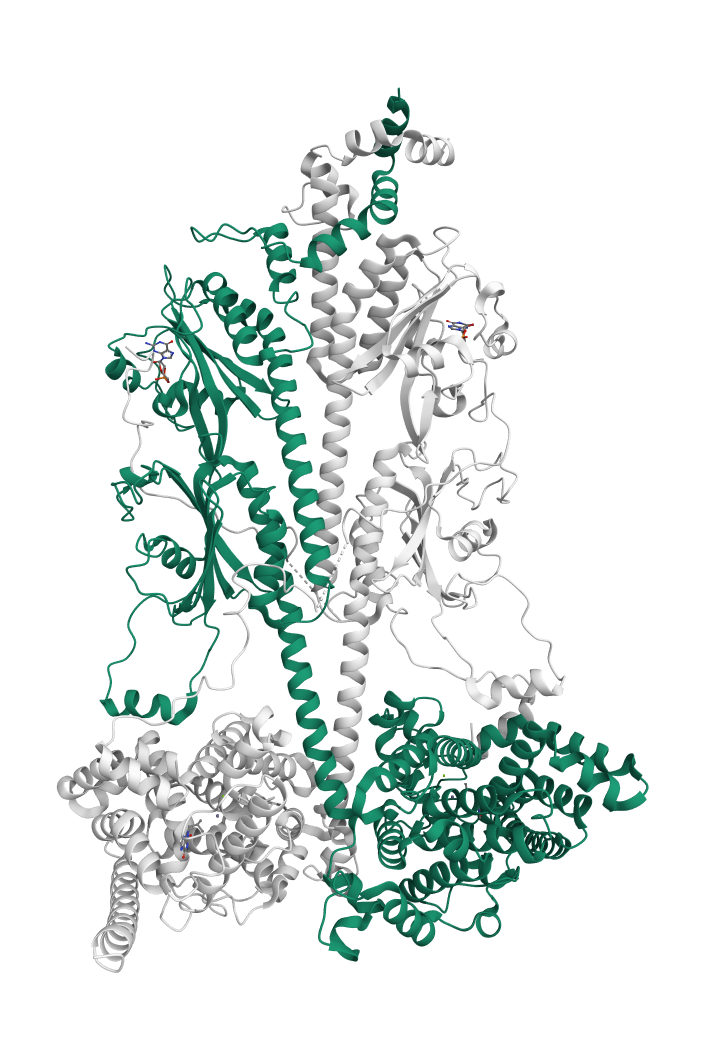

Identifiers
- Aliases: PDE6A, CGPR-A, PDEA, RP43, phosphodiesterase 6A
- External IDs: OMIM: 180071; MGI: 97524; GeneCards: PDE6A
Enzyme activity
EC #	BRENDA	ExPASy	KEGG	MetaCyc
3.1.4.35	↗	↗	↗	↗

Gene location (Human)
Chr.	Chromosome 5 (human)
Band	5q32	Start	149,857,953 bp
Band	5q32	End	149,944,793 bp

Gene location (Mouse)
Chr.	Chromosome 18 (mouse)
Band	18 E1|18 34.41 cM	Start	61,353,387 bp
Band	18 E1|18 34.41 cM	End	61,422,995 bp
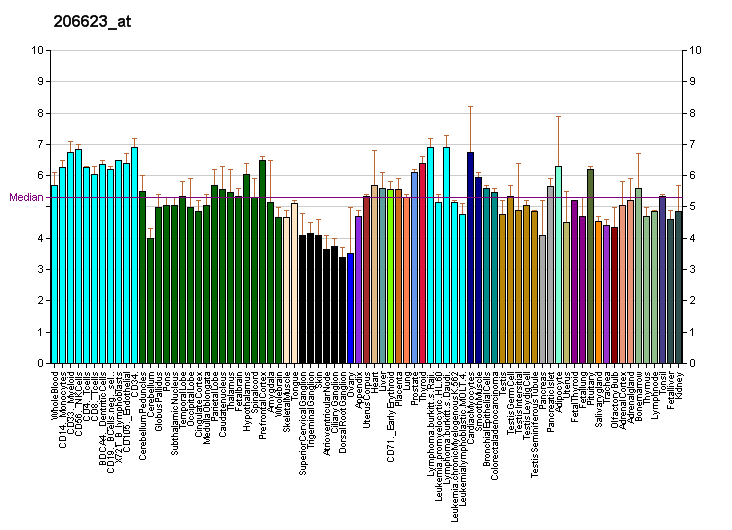
RNA expression pattern
Bgee	Human / Mouse (ortholog); Top expressed in: corpus epididymis; tail of epididymis; mucosa of transverse colon; mucosa of sigmoid colon; rectum; right adrenal cortex; left testis; right testis; pituitary gland; anterior pituitary / Top expressed in: neural layer of retina; retinal pigment epithelium; epithelium of lens; Ileal epithelium; secondary oocyte; spermatocyte; zygote; right kidney; outer nuclear layer; human kidney; More reference expression data
BioGPS	More reference expression data
Gene ontology
Molecular function	phosphoric diester hydrolase activity; 3',5'-cyclic-GMP phosphodiesterase activity; hydrolase activity; 3',5'-cyclic-nucleotide phosphodiesterase activity; metal ion binding
Cellular component	membrane; plasma membrane; photoreceptor disc membrane
Biological process	response to stimulus; GMP metabolic process; regulation of cytosolic calcium ion concentration; visual perception; signal transduction; regulation of rhodopsin mediated signaling pathway; G protein-coupled receptor signaling pathway; rhodopsin mediated signaling pathway; retina development in camera-type eye; Wnt signaling pathway, calcium modulating pathway
Sources:Amigo / QuickGO
Orthologs
Databases	NCBI: entry; OMA: entry
Species	Human	Mouse
Entrez	5145	225600
Ensembl	ENSG00000132915	ENSMUSG00000024575
UniProt	P16499	P27664
RefSeq (mRNA)	NM_000440	NM_146086
RefSeq (protein)	NP_000431	n/a
Location (UCSC)	Chr 5: 149.86 – 149.94 Mb	Chr 18: 61.35 – 61.42 Mb
PubMed search
- Wikidata
View/Edit Human	View/Edit Mouse

Rod cGMP-specific 3',5'-cyclic phosphodiesterase subunit alpha is an enzyme that in humans is encoded by the PDE6A gene.

PDE6A encodes the cyclic-GMP (cGMP) specific phosphodiesterase 6A alpha subunit, expressed in cells of the retinal rod outer segment. The phosphodiesterase 6 holoenzyme is a heterotrimer composed of an alpha, beta, and two gamma subunits. cGMP is an important regulator of rod cell membrane current, and its dynamic concentration is established by phosphodiesterase 6A cGMP hydrolysis and guanylate cyclase cGMP synthesis. Mutations in PDE6A have been identified as one cause of autosomal recessive retinitis pigmentosa.
