= 3',5'-cyclic-AMP phosphodiesterase =

Class of enzymes

3′,5′-cyclic-AMP phosphodiesterase

Identifiers
- EC no.: 3.1.4.53

Databases
- BRENDA: enzyme data
- ExPASy: NiceZyme view
- KEGG: enzyme entry
- MetaCyc: metabolic pathway
- Rhea: reactions
- PDB structures: RCSB PDB PDBe PDBsum
Search
- PMC: articles
- PubMed: articles
- NCBI: proteins

3′,5′-cyclic-AMP phosphodiesterase (EC 3.1.4.53, cAMP-specific phosphodiesterase, cAMP-specific PDE, PDE1, PDE2A, PDE2B, PDE4, PDE7, PDE8, PDEB1, PDEB2) is an enzyme with systematic name 3′,5′-cyclic-AMP 5′-nucleotidohydrolase. It catalyses the following reaction

cyclic adenosine monophosphate
H_{2}O
adenosine monophosphate

The enzyme characterised from Escherichia coli and mammalian cardiac tissue hydrolyses cyclic adenosine monophosphate to adenosine monophosphate. It requires Mg^{2+} or Mn^{2+} for activity. It has also been found in Trypanosoma species, Dictyostelium, and Leishmania major.
