= Caffeine dependence =

- Other names: Caffeine addiction
- Molecular structure of caffeine
- Specialty: Psychiatry

Caffeine dependence is substance dependence on caffeine. Conditions may include symptoms of tolerance, withdrawal, persistent desire or unsuccessful efforts to control use, and continued use despite knowledge of adverse consequences attributed to caffeine. Such dependence can be physical, psychological, or both.

Caffeine is a stimulant of the central nervous system (CNS). It is found naturally in coffee and tea, and can be added to food as an additive. Caffeinated beverages are drinks with natural or artificially added caffeine, such as caffeinated alcoholic beverages, energy drinks, and colas. Some pills, like pain relievers, also contain caffeine. A 2015 study found that 89 percent of adults in the U.S. consume on average 200 mg of caffeine daily, between 2001 and 2010. One area of concern that has been presented is the relationship between pregnancy and caffeine consumption, as repeated caffeine doses of 100 mg appeared to result in higher risk of low birth weight. The maximum daily recommended intake for caffeine is generally cited as 400 mg.

== Definition ==
Prolonged caffeine use can cause mild to moderate physical dependence. In the human body, caffeine blocks adenosine receptors A_{1} and A_{2A}. Adenosine is a by-product of cellular activity: the stimulation of adenosine receptors produces sedation and a desire for sleep. Caffeine's ability to block these receptors means the levels of the body's natural stimulants, dopamine and norepinephrine, continue at higher levels.

Continued exposure to caffeine prompts the body to create more adenosine receptors in the central nervous system, which increases the body's adenosine sensitivity. This reduces the stimulatory effects of caffeine by increasing tolerance. It also causes the body to suffer withdrawal symptoms (e.g., headaches, fatigue, and irritability) if caffeine intake decreases.

The fifth edition of the Diagnostic and Statistical Manual of Mental Disorders (DSM-5) describes four caffeine-related disorders including intoxication, withdrawal, anxiety, and sleep. Additionally, the DSM-5's Section III: Emerging Measures and Models defines a proposed diagnosis titled caffeine use disorder. This proposed disorder is mainly characterized by persistent use of caffeine despite the use having harmful effects and there being a desire to reduce consumption. The diagnosis also contains non-required criteria such as "[r]ecurrent caffeine use resulting in a failure to fulfill major role obligations at work, school, or home".

Pathologically reinforced caffeine use induces dependence, but not an addiction. For a drug to induce an addiction from repeated use at sufficiently high doses, it must activate the brain's reward circuitry, particularly the mesolimbic pathway. Neuroimaging studies of preclinical and human subjects have demonstrated that chronic caffeine consumption does not sufficiently activate the reward system, relative to other drugs of addiction (e.g., cocaine, morphine, nicotine). As a consequence, compulsive use (i.e., an addiction) of caffeine has yet to be observed in humans. Caffeine dependence forms due to caffeine antagonizing the adenosine A_{2A} receptor, effectively blocking adenosine from the adenosine receptor site. This delays the onset of drowsiness and releases dopamine. As of right now, caffeine withdrawal qualifies as a psychiatric condition by the American Psychiatric Association, but caffeine use disorder does not.

Roland R. Griffiths, professor of neurology at Johns Hopkins argues for the classification of caffeine withdrawal as a psychological disorder. In a 2004 research, Griffiths suggested that withdrawal affects 50% of habitual coffee drinkers. Withdrawal symptoms begin within 12–24 hours after the last caffeine intake, peaking in 20–48 hours, and last for up to 9 days. In another study, he concluded that people who take in a minimum of 100 mg of caffeine per day (about the amount in one cup of coffee) can acquire a physical dependence that would trigger withdrawal symptoms, including muscle pain and stiffness, nausea, vomiting, depressed mood, and other symptoms.

== Physiological effects ==
Caffeine dependence can cause a host of physiological effects if caffeine consumption is not maintained. Withdrawal symptoms may include headaches, fatigue, difficulty concentrating, lack of motivation, mood swings, nausea, insomnia, dizziness, cardiac issues, hypertension, anxiety, backaches, and joint pain; these can range in severity from mild to severe. These symptoms may occur within 12–24 hours and can last two to nine days. Research suggests that the circadian cycle is not significantly changed under popular practices of caffeine consumption in the morning and during the afternoon.

=== Children and teenagers ===
According to the American Academy of Pediatrics (AAP), it is not recommended for individuals under the age of 18 to consume several caffeinated drinks in one day. Failure to restrict caffeine intake can lead to side effects such as increase in heart rate and blood pressure, sleep disturbance, mood swings, and acid reflux. Caffeine's lasting effects on children's nervous and cardiovascular systems are currently unknown. Some research has suggested that caffeinated drinks should not be advertised to children as a primary audience.

=== Pregnancy ===
If pregnant, it is recommended not to consume more than 200 mg of caffeine a day (though this is relative to the pregnant woman's weight). If a pregnant woman consumes high levels of caffeine, it can result in low birth weight due to loss of blood flow to the placenta, and could lead to health problems later in the child's life. It can also result in premature labor, reduced fertility, and other reproductive issues. The American Pregnancy Association suggests "avoiding caffeine as much as possible" before and during pregnancy or discussing how to curtail dependency with a healthcare provider.

== Treatment ==
Because caffeine is a widely consumed substance, many individuals exhibit some signs of dependency. Caffeine dependence can be managed through gradual dose reduction (tapering), caffeine tracking, regular exercise, or behavioral counseling.

=== Dose tapering ===
Gradually reducing caffeine allows the body to adjust, minimizing withdrawal symptoms such as headaches and fatigue. Tapering schedules have been shown to help consumers lower their caffeine intake more effectively than stopping abruptly.

== See also ==
- Caffeine-induced anxiety disorder
- Caffeine-induced psychosis
- Caffeine-induced sleep disorder
- Caffeine toxicity
