= Low caffeine coffee =

Type of coffee

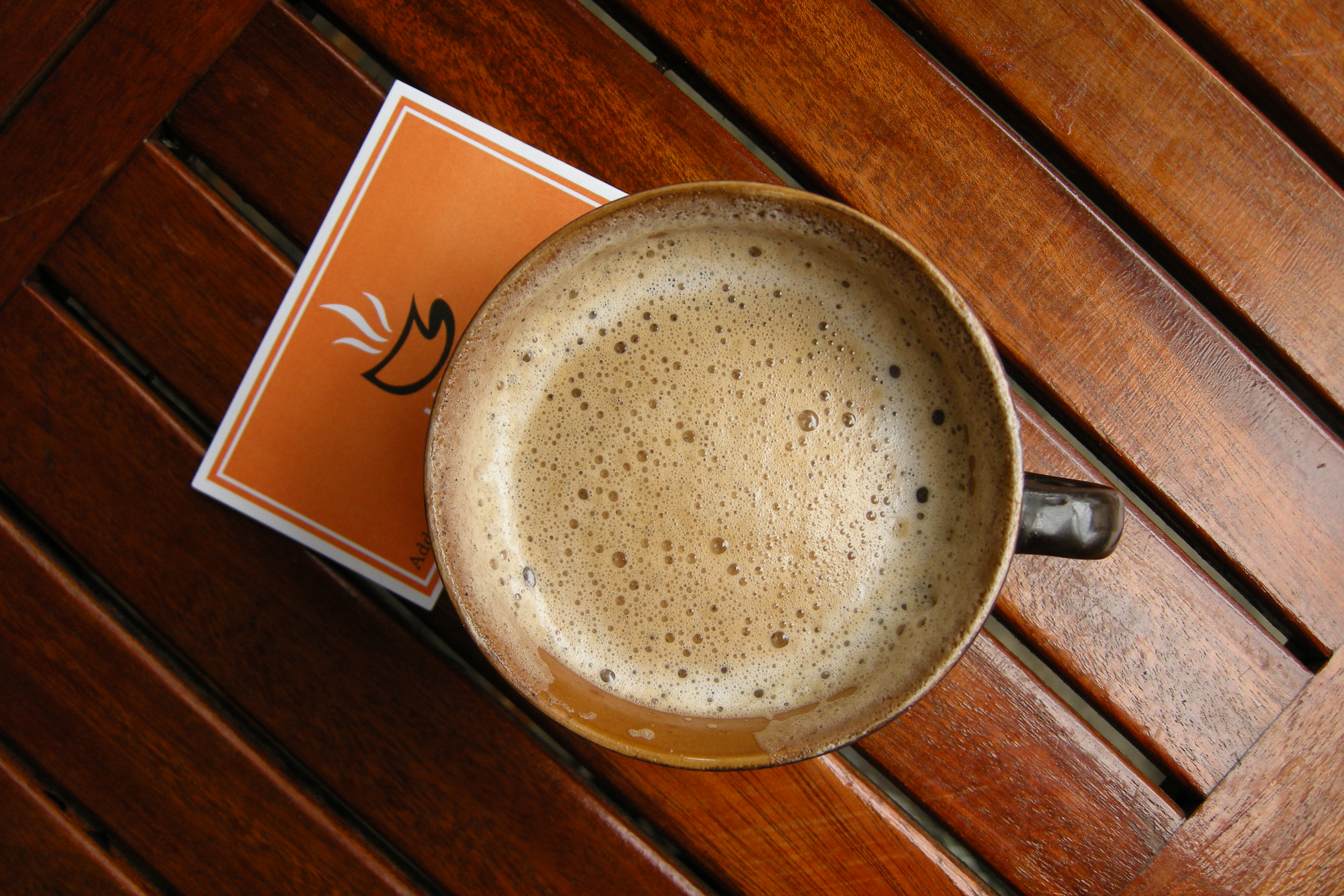
A cup of low caffeine Arabica coffee in Hanoi, Vietnam.

Low caffeine coffee is a term that is used by coffee producers to describe coffee that has not been subjected to a process of decaffeination, but is substantially lower in caffeine than average coffee. Samples of coffee vary widely in caffeine levels due to many factors, some well documented (such as genetics) and some not fully understood, such as the action of soil, water levels and sunlight. Low caffeine coffees are typically created by assaying caffeine levels of different bean lots and selecting the best flavor profile from the lots that are naturally lowest in caffeine.

== Decaffeination ==
In the case of decaffeinated coffee, eliminating caffeine can cause a sharp decline in the natural taste of the coffee bean. During the process of decaffeination, coffee producers use a variety of ways to remove caffeine from coffee, often by means of chemical manipulation and the use of potentially harmful chemical components, such as methylene chloride. One process that uses water as a solvent is the patented Swiss Water Process, which relies on soaking beans in a bath which is essentially brewed coffee from unroasted green beans. The caffeine permeates into the bath at a much higher rate than most of the flavor elements. While the process is certified organic, the water solubility of coffee flavor compounds assures that some of the coffee flavor is lost or changed by the bath. The process is more costly than methods using other solvents, and is performed commercially by only one plant in British Columbia, Canada. Therefore, only a small percentage of decaffeinated coffee available on the market uses this method. Decaffeination using ethyl acetate, often known as the sugarcane method as ethyl acetate can be derived from a byproduct of sugarcane fermentation, is widely regarded to be the method which retains the most origin flavor of the treated beans.

== Risks of caffeine ==
In large amounts, and especially over extended periods of time, caffeine can lead to a condition known as caffeinism. Caffeinism usually combines caffeine dependency with a wide range of unpleasant physical and mental conditions including nervousness, irritability, anxiety, tremulousness, muscle twitching (hyperreflexia), insomnia, headaches, respiratory alkalosis, and heart palpitations. Furthermore, because caffeine increases the production of stomach acid, high consumption over time may lead to peptic ulcers, erosive esophagitis, and gastroesophageal reflux disease.

There are four caffeine-induced psychiatric disorders recognized by the Diagnostic and Statistical Manual of Mental Disorders, Fourth Edition: caffeine intoxication, caffeine-induced anxiety disorder, caffeine-induced sleep disorder, and caffeine-related disorder not otherwise specified (NOS).

There are also risks associated with consuming caffeine during pregnancy, with studies having shown more than 200 mg of caffeine per day can result in miscarriage.

== Naturally low-caffeine coffees ==
Arabica coffee (Coffea arabica) is one of the most common varieties of coffee seen on today's market and is widely accessible. While not specifically a low-caffeine variety, it has roughly half the caffeine of robusta coffee (C. canephora). As such, the average person can consume two cups of arabica coffee with the same effect as consuming one cup of robusta, at least as far as caffeine goes. For more precise measurements of caffeine in common foods and beverages, please reference the table below adapted from USFDA estimates:

Item	Caffeine Content
Robusta coffee (drip brewed)	140–200 mg caffeine per 6 ounce average cup
Arabica coffee (drip brewed)	75–130 mg average 6 ounce cup
Arabica/Excelsa blend coffee (drip brewed)	40–60 mg average 6 ounce cup
Espresso (typical serving)	30–50 mg average 1 ounce cup
Instant coffee	40–100 mg average 6 ounce cup
97% decaf coffee (per caffeine content)	3–6 mg caffeine per 6-7 ounces average cup
99.92% Euro decaf standard coffee (per total mass)	8–16 mg caffeine per 6-7 ounces average cup
Hot Cocoa	10–15 mg caffeine per 6-7 ounce cup
Dark chocolate candy bar	50–100 mg caffeine per 6 ounce bar
Milk chocolate candy bar	30–50 mg caffeine per 6 ounce bar
Coke, Pepsi, Mountain Dew Soda	20–26 mg caffeine per 6-7 ounce drink
Green tea (brewed)	12–30 mg per 6-7 ounce average cup
Black tea (brewed)	40–60 mg per 6-7 ounce average cup

Along with Arabica, several coffee producers are now offering options of low-caffeine coffee, which can provide a solution for those who do not want to make the switch to decaf. In nature, coffee grows with varying levels of caffeine. Given various environmental factors, certain beans will grow with more caffeine than others, thereby creating an opportunity to produce naturally low caffeine coffee. Western producers have not yet shown a desire to sort purchased bean lots by caffeine content as a priority. Typically, Asian producers grade individual lots by caffeine level and follow through to roasting in order to standardize caffeine content as one of the criteria for blending.

There are a few coffea species in which are naturally low to very minimal caffeine. Many of these species are not in production and have only been identified in the wild as low caffeine levels. Eugenioides Coffee (Coffea eugenioides), Laurina (aka Bourbon Pointu) and Racemosa Coffee (Coffea racemosa) are all examples of species that have been identified as having a naturally very low level of caffeine.
