= Caffeine toxicity =

Intoxication due to overconsumption of caffeine

- Other names: Caffeine overdose, caffeinism
- Specialty: Toxicology

Caffeine toxicity, also known as caffeine overdose, is a state of intoxication caused by excessive caffeine. This intoxication covers a variety of unpleasant physical and mental symptoms associated with the consumption of excessive amounts of caffeine.

Caffeine is considered one of the most widely consumed drugs around the world. Around 80% of the world population consumes caffeine in one form or another. It is found in coffee, tea, caffeinated alcoholic drinks, cocoa, chocolate, soft drinks, especially cola, and is an important component of energy drinks and other dietary supplements.

Caffeine is also an ingredient of several medications, many of them over-the-counter and prescription drugs. It has effects throughout the body.

== Signs and symptoms ==
Primary symptoms of caffeine intoxication

In moderate doses, caffeine is used to reduce physical fatigue, to prevent drowsiness and sleep, and to maintain and restore mental alertness and wakefulness in the short term. However, at higher doses, these stimulatory effects can become excessive and lead to a wide range of unpleasant symptoms including a dysphoric physical and mental state that is labeled caffeinism and is also known colloquially as "coffee nerves" or "caffeine jitters." These symptoms include nervousness, irritability, restlessness, insomnia, headaches, and palpitations after caffeine use.

Caffeinism usually occurs when consumption of caffeine reaches 1–1.5 grams (0.035–0.053 oz) per day. For reference, a brewed 8oz (227ml) cup of coffee contains ~95 mg of caffeine (per USDA).

According to the Diagnostic and Statistical Manual of Mental Disorders, caffeine overdose can result in a state of excessive stimulation of the central nervous system and the essential feature of caffeine intoxication is the recent consumption of caffeine. This diagnosis requires the presence of at least five signs or symptoms, from a list of 12, that develop during or shortly after caffeine use. This syndrome regularly happens when a person ingested large amounts of caffeine from any source (e.g., more than 400–500 mg at a time).

The signs and symptoms are divided into one group that can appear after an intake of as little as 100 mg of caffeine (roughly the amount contained in a cup of brewed coffee) and another group of symptoms that appear at higher levels of intake (more than 1 g per day). Low-dose symptoms include:

- restlessness
- nervousness
- excitement
- insomnia
- flushed face
- diuresis (increased urination)
- gastrointestinal disturbance

Symptoms associated with high doses include:

- muscle twitching
- rambling flow of thought and speech
- tachycardia and cardiac arrhythmia,
- periods of inexhaustibility
- psychomotor agitation
- anorexia (loss of appetite)
- seizures
- death

The symptoms of caffeine intoxication are comparable to the symptoms of overdoses of other stimulants. In cases of much larger overdoses, mania, depression, lapses in judgment, disorientation, disinhibition, delusions, weight loss, loss of appetite, hallucinations, or psychosis may occur.

Death can occur as a result of caffeine overdose. The LD_{50} of caffeine in humans is dependent on individual sensitivity, but is estimated to be 150–200 milligrams per kilogram of body mass (75–100 cups of coffee for a 70 kilogram adult). A number of fatalities have been caused by overdoses of readily available powdered caffeine supplements, for which the estimated lethal amount is less than a tablespoon. The lethal dose is lower in individuals whose ability to metabolize caffeine is impaired due to genetics or chronic liver disease. A death was reported in a man with liver cirrhosis who overdosed on caffeinated mints.

== Treatment ==
Treatment of mild caffeine intoxication is directed toward symptom relief; severe intoxication may require peritoneal dialysis, hemodialysis, or hemofiltration. Control of caffeine intake requires awareness of the caffeine content of caffeinated beverages, over-the-counter drugs, and other sources of caffeine in the diet. Such information is not easy to obtain. The content of brewed beverages such as coffee and tea varies greatly based on the method of preparation.

There is no standard value for "a cup of coffee". The caffeine content of cola drinks and most energy drinks can be difficult to determine, because in many cases the labels do not indicate the dose per serving. Caffeine doses in these beverages range from 20 to 30 mg in some soft drinks, up to 350 mg or more in some energy drinks. Although some websites report caffeine content for beverages, official lists are not available and the number of brands continually grows.

Attempting to abruptly discontinue all consumption of caffeine-containing products from the diet is not usually recommended. The person could suffer from severe symptoms of caffeine withdrawal including headaches, fatigue, and difficulty concentrating. It is recommended that the person reduces caffeine consumption gradually to avoid withdrawal as attempts to suddenly discontinue all caffeine consumption are frequently abandoned due to the severity of the withdrawal symptoms.

== Epidemiology ==
Little is known about the prevalence of caffeinism in the general population. Although most people are familiar with the disorder, it probably remains underdiagnosed, because patients are rarely questioned about the use of caffeine.

== See also ==
- Caffeine-induced anxiety disorder
- Caffeine-induced psychosis
- Caffeine-induced sleep disorder
- Decaffeination
- Effect of caffeine on memory
