= Caffeine patch =

Transdermal patch that releases caffeine into the body

A caffeine patch is a type of a transdermal patch designed to deliver caffeine to the body through the skin. The concept is similar to that of a nicotine patch.

Caffeine is a stimulant of the methylxanthine class. It is mainly used recreationally to increase alertness in beverage form. Caffeine's structure is similar to that of adenosine, a naturally occurring molecule that has many physiologic effects on the body. Due to caffeine's popularity as the world's most consumed drug, it has been altered to several forms for use such as beverages, pills, and patches.

== Pharmacodynamics ==
When a person is awake and alert, their brain has low levels of adenosine built up. The longer they stay awake, the more adenosine builds up and makes them feel sleepy. This happens because adenosine attaches to certain cell receptors in the brain that cause drowsiness.

When a person consumes caffeine, it blocks (antagonizes) the adenosine from attaching to those receptors, and as a result, they feel less sleepy and more alert. Caffeine's effect is only temporary and can help maintain or restore alertness.

=== Receptor and ion channel targets ===
Caffeine can cross the blood-brain barrier, which means it can enter the brain and affect the nervous system directly. Caffeine is particularly good at blocking the A2A Adenosine receptor. Blocking the A2A receptor is thought to be responsible for promoting wakefulness.

Caffeine also affects other systems in the body such as heart rate, breathing rate, and blood vessels. It can also cause the release of neurotransmitters like monoamines and acetylcholine, which contribute to its stimulating effects.

Apart from blocking adenosine receptors, caffeine also blocks the inositol trisphosphate receptor 1, the ionotropic glycine receptor, and activates ryanodine receptors. Together these actions contribute to the stimulating effects of caffeine felt after consuming it.

=== Enzyme targets ===
Caffeine blocks an enzyme called phosphodiesterase, which leads to an intracellular increase in a molecule called cyclic AMP (cAMP). This increase activates another enzyme called protein kinase A, which can reduce inflammation. Caffeine also has an effect on another chemical called acetylcholine, by slowing down the activity of an enzyme that breaks it down in the body, cholinesterase thus leading to an increase in acetylcholine levels.

== Transdermal skin permeation ==
=== Anatomic site ===
Several studies measured the total amount of caffeine penetrated via patch on different anatomical sites and were ranked as follows:

1. Forehead
2. Arm
3. Post auricular region (behind the ear)
4. Abdomen.

=== Influence of age of skin ===
Researchers studied how skin aging affects the absorption of caffeine by the body. They found that older subjects absorbed more caffeine than younger subjects due to reduced sebaceous gland activity and skin lipid content. However, changes in skin hydration and corneocyte size could also play a role.

=== Influence of skin washing ===
A 2010 study showed that caffeine residue loosely sits on the skin and is not quickly absorbed. People who wash the skin around their caffeine patch showed significantly lower levels of caffeine. Therefore, for maximum effects it is suggested to avoid washing the area where the patch is placed.

=== Caffeine transport through hairy skin ===
Several studies have looked at the effect hair has on skin absorption. It has been demonstrated that hair follicles are considered a weak spot in the protective barrier against certain types of drugs. This suggests that increasing the number of hair follicles allows for a faster delivery of topically applied solutions.

== Medical application ==
=== Neonatal apnea ===
Caffeine is a first line treatment for neonatal apnea due to its metabolites' (theophyllines) effects on the lungs and breathing rate. Oral administration of medication in neonates is difficult for several reasons. Poor swallowing and GI compromise often lead to unpredictable and erratic dosing. This makes transdermal delivery of medications an ideal and promising choice. Studies have shown that caffeine applied twice daily in gel formulation in neonates is sufficient to maintain therapeutic levels of caffeine while avoiding oral dosing complications.

== Cosmetic use ==
=== Cellulite ===
Cellulite is a complex skin condition involving multiple factors such as microcirculatory, lymphatic drainage, extracellular matrix, and excess fat accumulation. Caffeine has been hypothesized to help with this as it stimulates lipolysis (fat metabolism) and lymphatic drainage thus helping remove accumulated fat and toxins. Caffeine also increases blood flow through the microcirculation further assisting in removing toxins and waste products. Studies using caffeine patches at various concentrations show promising results in the treatment of cellulite.

=== Miscellaneous ===
Caffeine has also been shown to reduce swelling around the eyes although this use is usually via a gel formula of caffeine.

Caffeine exerts antioxidant effects, prevents UV skin damage, stimulates hair growth, and inhibits hair loss. These effects have made it an area of interest in adding caffeine to sunscreens, shampoos, and conditioners.

== Challenges ==
Transdermal absorption of caffeine is difficult because of its hydrophilic structure. Current promising research is underway utilizing hydrogel microneedles in an attempt to bypass the obstacles in skin permeation.
