= Caffeine (data page) =

Chemical data page

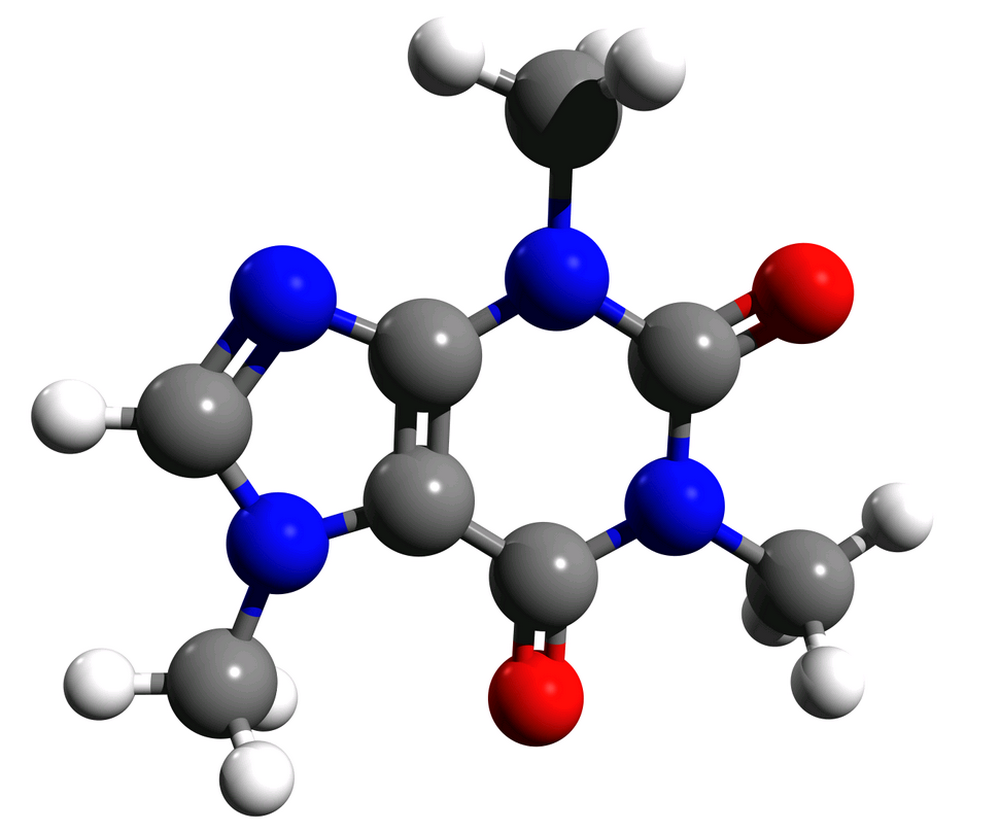
Hybrid skeletal structure of the caffeine molecule
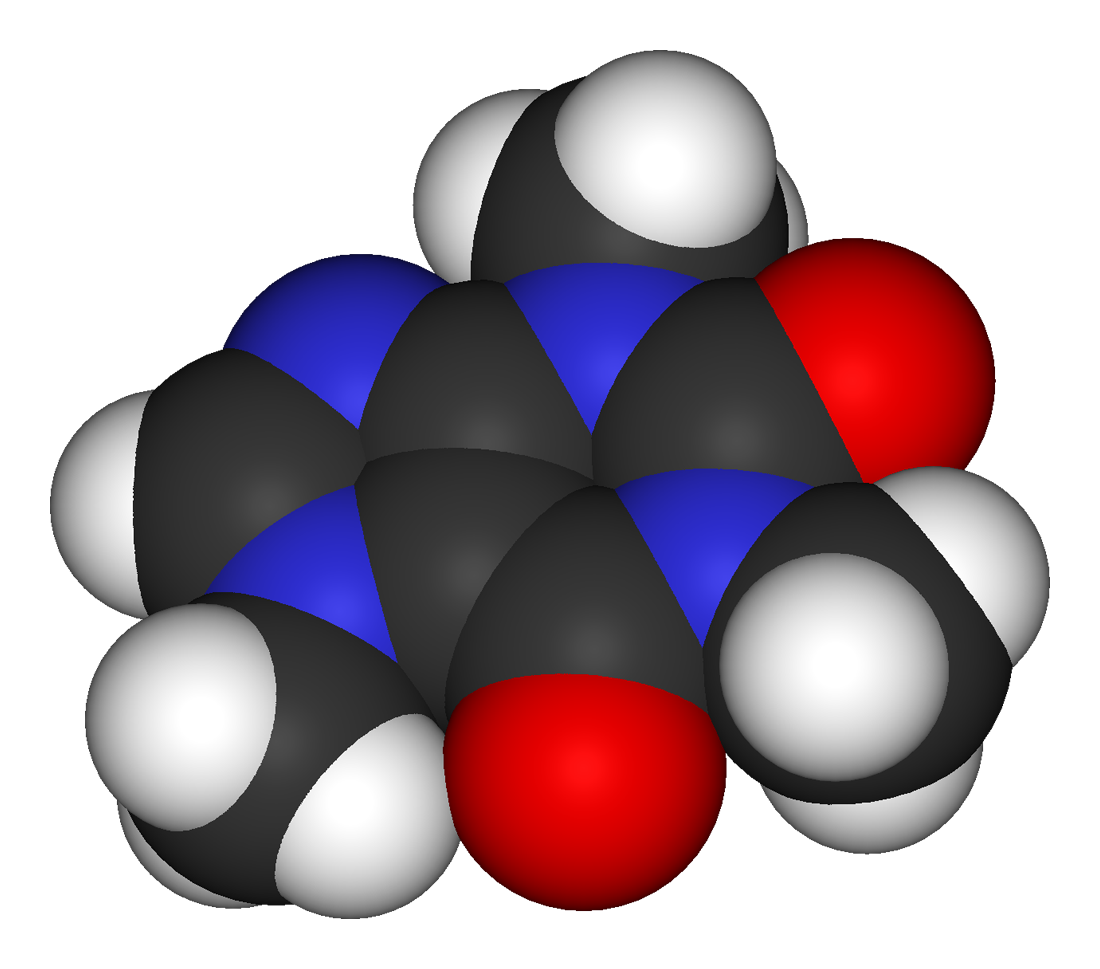

Names
- IUPAC names 1,3,7-Trimethyl-3,7-dihydro-1H-purine-2,6-dione; 1,3,7-trimethyl-1H-purine-2,6(3H,7H)-dione; 3,7-dihydro-1,3,7-trimethyl-1H-purine-2,6-dione

This page provides supplementary chemical data on caffeine.

Caffeine
Identifiers
CAS Number	58-08-2
3D model (JSmol)	Interactive image; Interactive image
Beilstein Reference	17705
ChEBI	CHEBI:27732
ChEMBL	ChEMBL113
ChemSpider	2424
DrugBank	DB00201
EC Number	200-362-1
Gmelin Reference	103040
IUPHAR/BPS	407
KEGG	D00528
PubChem CID	2519
RTECS number	EV6475000
UNII	3G6A5W338E
- InChI: InChI=1S/C8H10N4O2/c1-10-4-9-6-5(10)7(13)12(3)8(14)11(6)2/h4H,1-3H3 Key: RYYVLZVUVIJVGH-UHFFFAOYSA-N; InChI=1/C8H10N4O2/c1-10-4-9-6-5(10)7(13)12(3)8(14)11(6)2/h4H,1-3H3 Key: RYYVLZVUVIJVGH-UHFFFAOYAW
- SMILES: O=C2N(c1ncn(c1C(=O)N2C)C)C; Cn1cnc2c1c(=O)n(c(=O)n2C)C

Caffeine
Properties
Chemical formula	C_{8}H_{10}N_{4}O_{2}
Molar mass	194.194 g·mol^{−1}
Appearance	Odorless, white needles or powder
Density	1.23 g/cm^{3}, solid
Melting point	227 to 228 °C (441 to 442 °F; 500 to 501 K) (anhydrous); 234 to 235 °C (453 to 455 °F; 507 to 508 K) (monohydrate)
Boiling point	178 °C (352 °F; 451 K) (sublimation)
Solubility in water	2.17 g/100 mL (25 °C); 18.0 g/100 mL (80 °C); 67.0 g/100 mL (100 °C)
Acidity (pK_{a})	−0.13–1.22
Dipole moment	3.64 D (calculated)

Caffeine
Hazards
- GHS labelling
Pictograms	(GHS07: Exclamation mark)
Signal word	Warning
Hazard statements	H302
Precautionary statements	P264, P270, P301+P312, P501
NFPA 704 (fire diamond)	2 0 0
- Lethal dose or concentration (LD, LC)
LD_{50} (median dose)	192 mg/kg (rat, oral)
Safety data sheet (SDS)	ICSC 0405

This box:
- Except where noted otherwise, data relate to Standard temperature and pressure.
- Reliability of data general note.
