= Methylxanthines =

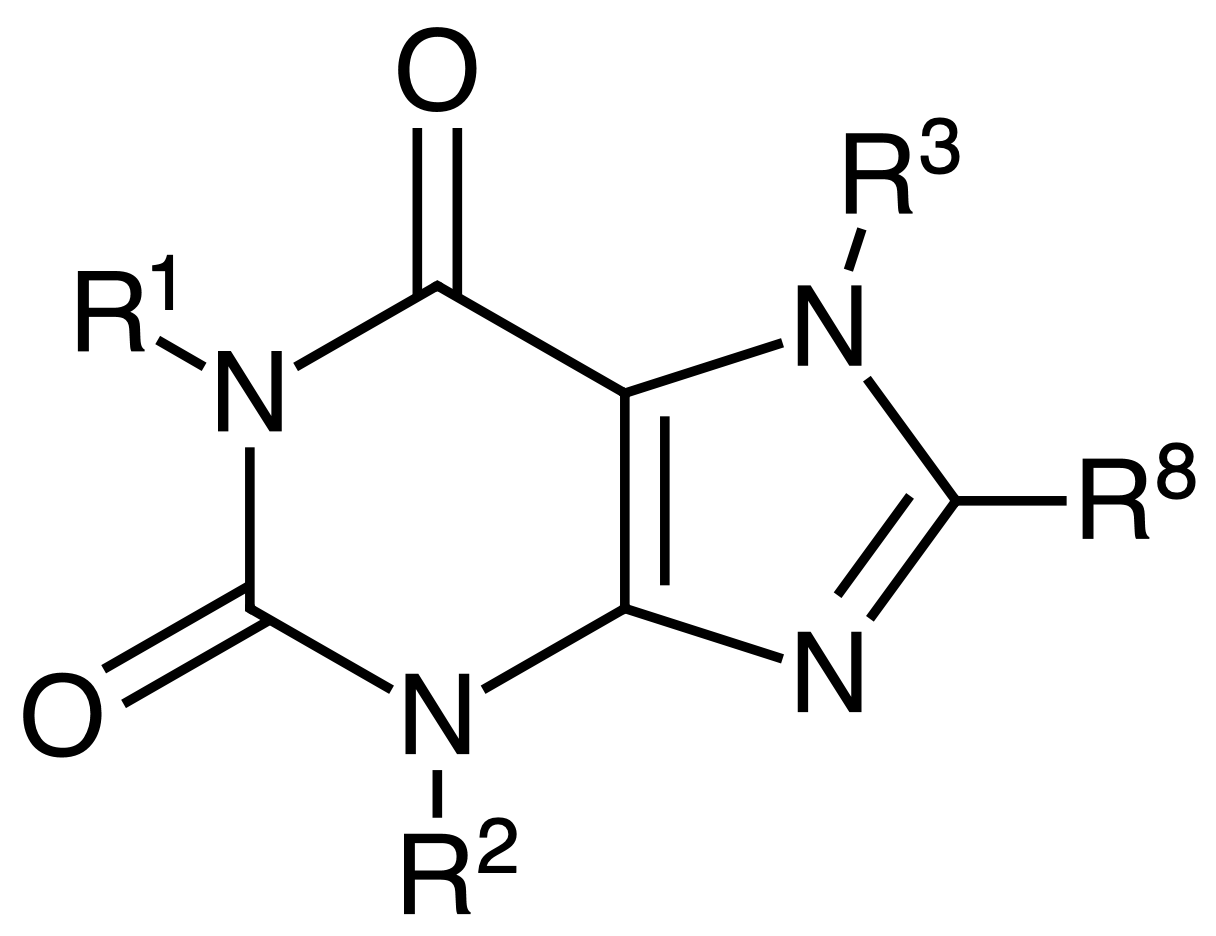

Methylxanthines are chemical compounds which are derivatives of xanthine with one or more methyl groups, including:

One methyl group:

- 1-Methylxanthine
- 3-Methylxanthine
- 7-Methylxanthine

Two methyl groups:

- Theophylline (1,3-dimethylxanthine)
- Paraxanthine (1,7-dimethylxanthine)
- Theobromine (3,7-dimethylxanthine)

Three methyl groups:

- Caffeine (1,3,7-trimethylxanthine)

== General references ==
- Fredholm, Bertil B. (22 September 2010). Methylxanthines. Springer Science & Business Media. ISBN 978-3-642-13443-2.
