= Effect of caffeine on memory =

Caffeine is a bitter, white crystalline xanthine alkaloid that acts as a psychoactive stimulant drug. It can have both positive and negative effects on different aspects of memory.

Caffeine molecule

== Short-term memory ==
The effect of caffeine on short-term memory (STM) is debated amongst academics. Studies conclude that caffeine intake improves the performance of short-term and working memory, specifically associating caffeine intake with a shortened reaction time. However, these findings are inconsistent and other studies conclude that caffeine has a detrimental effect on working memory. Increasing memory capacity would result in retaining more information for extended periods of time and encoding information from STM to long-term memory. However, research consensus indicates that caffeine's effect on working memory depends largely on its dosage, and the working memory load.

=== Auditory effects within short-term memory ===
Caffeine's effects in memory were also investigated in the auditory system. The Auditory-Verbal Learning Test is a memory test that assesses recall of heard lists of words in single and multiple trials. Caffeinated subjects recalled fewer words than control subjects, and caffeinated subjects showed a greater deficit in recalling the middle- to end-portions of the lists.

=== Working memory effects ===
Caffeine's effects on short term and working memory have been investigated in relation to the tip of the tongue effect. Older research suggests that caffeine decreases the number and duration of tip of the tongue effects by improving short-term memory capacity. More recent research has shown that improved performance attributed to caffeine is due to phonological loop priming, not to general "alertness effects". Subjects were asked to listen to and recall lists of words. The number of tip of the tongue occurrences were counted under two priming conditions: The word lists contained either phonologically similar or phonologically distinct words. Caffeinated subjects had fewer tip of the tongue events when primed with phonologically similar words and a marked increase of tip of the tongue events when primed with phonologically distinct words. The control group showed a significant increase of tip of the tongue events when primed with phonologically similar words, the opposite of the caffeinated group. This led the researchers to conclude that caffeine effects phonological priming rather than memory storage.

A study in which caffeinated subjects were tested for recall after fast and slow presentation of word lists found no significant effects of caffeine for male subjects. Female subjects showed decreased recall after slow presentation.

=== Time-of-day effects ===
Short-term memory has been thought to be influenced differently throughout the day when caffeine has been ingested. Three groups of caffeine intake (low, medium, and high) were compared during four daytime hours (01:00, 07:00, 13:00, 19:00). People with low caffeine intake have a decreased performance later in the day, compared to moderate and a high-level caffeine intake. Thus the effect of caffeine on short-term memory can differ due to many other factors and thus cannot be instantly generalized.

=== State Dependent Memory ===
Caffeine users are subject to state dependent memory effects when under the effects of caffeine. For example, a study tasked two groups of subjects to remember word lists; half of them had caffeine while the other half were given placebos. When brought back the next day, each original group was now split in half, half of them given the same treatment they were encoded under, the other half given the opposite treatment. Ultimately the study showed that subjects that were under the same treatment in both encoding and retrieval outperformed the other groups. This study does not support a decline or enhancement in working memory due to caffeine but rather a state-dependent effect instead.

== Long-term memory ==
Caffeine has been shown to have positive, negative, and no effects on long-term memory. When studying the effects of this and any drug, potential ethical restraints on human study procedures may lead researchers to conduct studies involving animal subjects in addition to human subjects.

=== Positive effects of caffeine on long-term memory ===
Positive effects of caffeine on long-term memory have been shown in a study analyzing habitual caffeine intake of coffee or tea in addition to consuming other substances. Their effect on cognitive processes was observed by performing numerous cognitive tasks. Words were presented and delayed recall was measured. Increased delayed recall was demonstrated by individuals with moderate to high habitual caffeine intake (mean 710 mg/week) as more words were successfully recalled compared to those with low habitual caffeine intake (mean 178 mg/week). Therefore, improved performance in long-term memory was shown with increased habitual caffeine intake due to better storage or retrieval. A similar study assessing effects of caffeine on cognition and mood resulted in improved delayed recall with caffeine intake. A dose-response relationship was seen as individuals were able to recall more words after a period of time with increased caffeine. Improvement of long-term memory with caffeine intake was also seen in a study using rats and a water maze. In this study, completion of training sessions prior to performing numerous trials in finding a platform in the water maze was observed. Caffeine was consumed by the rats before and after the training sessions. There was no effect of caffeine consumption before the training sessions; however, a greater effect was seen at a low dosage immediately afterward. In other words, the rats were able to find the platform faster when caffeine was consumed after the training sessions rather than before. This implies that memory acquisition was not affected, while increases in memory retention were.

=== Negative effects of caffeine on long-term memory ===
Researchers have found that long-term consumption of low dose caffeine slowed hippocampus-dependent learning and impaired long-term memory in mice. Caffeine consumption for 4 weeks also significantly reduced hippocampal neurogenesis, a process by which the brain creates new neurons to assist in memory retention, compared to controls during the experiment. The conclusion was that long-term consumption of caffeine could inhibit hippocampus-dependent learning and memory partially through inhibition of hippocampal neurogenesis.

In another study, mice were introduced into a lighted box with a dark box attached (a step-through passive-avoidance task). Mice are naturally drawn to the dark but entering the dark box would cause them to receive an electric shock. Caffeine was given before the task in doses ranging from 11.55 mg/kg to 92.4 mg/kg (the human equivalent of between 4 and 28, 8 oz cups of coffee). The next day, the mice were reintroduced into the apparatus and their delay in entering the dark box was measured. Caffeine administered at high doses correlated to a decrease in delay from 180 seconds to 105 seconds. Lower doses of caffeine had no significant effect. Linear regression analysis suggested a dose-response relationship between caffeine intake and dark box avoidance.

=== No effect of caffeine on long-term memory ===
Alternatively, other studies have shown that caffeine intake has no effect on long-term memory. This was expressed in a study whereby either caffeine or a placebo was assigned to several subjects at two different times. Some subjects received caffeine first, while others received a placebo. All participants were shown a word list which would eventually be tested. Two days later, the same process was repeated, with random distribution of the two substances. This was also observed in a study involving the assessment of delayed recall using a verbal memory test. Two studies were completed using different control drinks containing caffeine.

== Age differences ==
=== Effects on young adults ===
The measured effects for this age group (15-25) are the most variable and conflicting. On the one hand, caffeine effects appear to be detrimental to short-term memory, working memory included, whereas the effects are somewhat positive for memory over the long term (for example, remembering something better many days later if caffeine was ingested during encoding as well as retrieval, as opposed to no caffeine). Many of the effects reported were for subjects who were not regular caffeine consumers. Regular consumers of caffeine, on the other hand, showed only positive effects when it came to memory tasks. An important factor to consider is that there was fairly wide-range daily caffeine consumption previous to the study, and this could have had a significant effect on performance of the task because not everyone is at the same baseline. Another study used a much larger subject pool and found that age-related differences were quite minimal for attentional memory, but that over the long term, regular caffeine consumption was fairly beneficial to younger subjects.

=== Effects on the middle aged ===
As previously stated, the most pronounced effect of caffeine on memory appears to be on middle-aged subjects (26-64). None of the studies provide reasoning for why this group would be most affected, but one could hypothesize that because of cognitive decline due to age, caffeine has a powerful effect on brain chemistry (although this would suggest the older the person, the stronger the effect of caffeine). Furthermore, this age group is most likely to be the largest consumer of caffeine. The main studies reporting this finding show that at low, acute doses of caffeine consumption, working memory only slightly affects those in this age group, while no effect is observed for younger or older subjects. The authors conclude that larger doses may be needed to produce results that are supported by previous literature, and this is an avenue for further research. Furthermore, it is argued that consumption of caffeine generally aids cognitive performance for this age group, as long one does not exceed the recommended dose of 300 mg per day.

=== Effects on the elderly ===
In older adults, memory is typically best in the morning and gradually declines over the day. Those who consumed caffeine in the morning showed much better memory, both short-term and long-term than those who consumed a placebo, especially in late afternoon, where memory and attention may be most crucial to daily functioning for the elderly. This is further supported by a study which showed that adults over the age of 65 who regularly consume caffeine in the morning are much more alert and function at a higher cognitive level throughout the day. The authors conclude that it is beneficial for older adults to regularly consume average doses of caffeine in the morning to boost cognitive performance and alertness in the afternoon. Again, one should not exceed the recommended dose of about 300 mg per day, otherwise memory performance declines due to over-consumption.

== Sex differences ==
Many studies provide support for the idea that caffeine has different effect on males versus females when related to memory. These differences can be seen through a number of memory types (short-term, long-term, etc.), with various theories accounting for these differing effects.

=== Short-term memory ===
Caffeine has been shown to have an impairing effect on females (but not males) in a word-list test of short-term memory. One prevailing theory which aims to explain this sex difference identifies estrogen levels in the body as an important factor relating to caffeine's effect on memory performance As a result, the female menstrual cycle (which influences overall estrogen levels in the body) may play a role in modifying the effect of caffeine on memory. Following this theory, researchers tested females within the first 5 days of their menstrual cycle and found that caffeine had a facilitative effect on female performance on a short-term memory test. A particular finding in this study relating to male memory performance revealed that at a lower dose, caffeine had an impairing effect; but at higher doses, no impairment was shown. Differing speeds of testing (words delivered slowly or quickly) in males served as a modifying factor on the effect of caffeine: higher doses aided in recall with faster presentation of words, and lower doses aided in recall with slower presentation of words.

=== Long-term memory ===
Limited research on long-term memory and sex differences indicates no notable difference in the effect of caffeine between males and females. Sex differences have not been thoroughly covered in the literature concerning caffeine's effect on memory. Since most studies do not report significant sex differences in this area of memory study, it is reasonable to assume that there is not strong evidence to support sex differences in caffeine's effect on memory. Further specific research into sex differences would be needed to fully understand the impacts of this popular drug on its users.
