= Caffeine-induced anxiety disorder =

Subclass of substance/medication-induced anxiety disorder

- Specialty: Psychiatry
- Symptoms: Fear, apprehension, worry, avoidance behaviour, physical signs of heightened autonomic activity
- Differential diagnosis: Anxiety and fear-related disorder, depressive disorder with prominent anxiety symptoms

Caffeine-induced anxiety disorder is a mental health condition in which anxiety symptoms emerge as a result of caffeine use. These symptoms may appear during or shortly after caffeine consumption or withdrawal. The disorder is characterised by excessive fear, apprehension, worry, and physical signs of heightened autonomic activity. In some cases, individuals may also exhibit avoidance behaviours due to anxiety.

This disorder is classified as a subtype of substance/medication-induced anxiety disorder in the DSM-5. It is also recognised as a clinical diagnosis in the ICD-11.

Consumption of caffeine has long been linked to anxiety. The effects of caffeine and the symptoms of anxiety both increase activity within the sympathetic nervous system. Caffeine has been linked to the aggravation and maintenance of anxiety disorders, and the initiation of panic or anxiety attacks in those who are already predisposed to such phenomena. Caffeine usage surpassing 400 mg has been shown to increase the likelihood for anxiety and panic attacks in a population. Individuals with panic attack disorder have a higher risk of developing a panic attack when consuming caffeine than when they do not. Excessive amounts of caffeine can result in symptoms from general anxiety to obsessive-compulsive and phobic symptoms.

== Diagnosis ==
=== DSM-5 ===
==== Diagnostic criteria ====
Caffeine-induced anxiety disorder is a subclass of the DSM-5 diagnosis of substance/medication-induced anxiety disorder. The Diagnostic and Statistical Manual of Mental Disorders, Fifth Edition, or DSM-5, is the current authority for psychiatric diagnosis in the United States. Substance/medication-induced anxiety disorder falls under the category of anxiety disorders in the DSM-5, and not the category of substance-related and addictive disorders, even though the symptoms are due to the effects of a substance.

Diagnosis according to the DSM-5 is dependent on various criteria. Patients must present symptoms of either panic attacks or anxiety. There must also be evidence that the panic or anxiety symptoms are a direct result of the use of the intoxicating substance. In caffeine-induced anxiety disorder, such symptoms would be due to the consumption of caffeine. The DSM-5 makes the distinction that the substance must be physiologically capable of leading to the anxiety and panic symptoms. This establishes the relationship between the abused chemical agent and the observed clinical effects. Caffeine has been shown to act as an antagonist on adenosine receptors, which acts as a stimulant and therefore fulfills this criterion. Symptoms must also not have a more likely clinical cause, such as another type of anxiety disorder, come before the ingestion of the intoxicating substance, or last for an extended amount of time after stopping the use of the substance. Diagnosis also requires that the panic attacks or anxiety due to the use of the intoxicating substance cause a certain amount of disturbance in the patient or lead to deficiency of varying types of daily performance.

==== Diagnostic features ====
In addition to the criteria above, it is important to recognize that the diagnostic criteria for substance/medication-induced anxiety disorder are not met if the symptoms of panic come before the intoxication by the substance. In caffeine-induced anxiety disorder, a diagnosis will not be made if symptoms of anxiety or panic precede the ingestion of caffeine. Also, if symptoms persist for more than one month after substance intoxication, the diagnosis cannot be made. Persistence and continuation of symptoms beyond the initial consumption of caffeine suggest an alternate diagnosis that would better explain the long-lasting symptoms. Anxiety symptoms caused by caffeine are often mistaken for serious mental disorders including bipolar disorder and schizophrenia, leaving patients medicated for the wrong issue. A caffeine-induced anxiety disorder diagnosis should be made, rather than a substance abuse or intoxication diagnosis, when symptoms of panic attacks or anxiety predominate.

==== Prevalence ====
Although exact rates of prevalence are not available, general population data shows a 0.002% prevalence over a year-long period and higher prevalence within clinical populations.

== Caffeine ==
Caffeine structure

Caffeine is a methylxanthine, and is hydrophobic. The structure of caffeine allows the molecule to pass freely through biological membranes including the blood-brain barrier. Absorption in the gastrointestinal tract reaches near completion at about 99% after only 45 minutes. Half-life of caffeine for most adults is between 2.5 and 4.5 hours when consumption is limited to less than 10 mg/kg. However, during neonatal development, half-life for the fetus is significantly longer and decreases exponentially after birth to reach a normal rate at about 6 months. Cytochrome P-450, a hemeprotein, acts in liver microsomes to metabolize caffeine into dimethylxanthines, monomethylxanthines, dimethyl uric acids, monomethyl uric acids, trimethylallantoin, dimethylallantoin, and derivatives of uracil. Most caffeine is metabolized by 3-methyl demethylation, forming the metabolite of paraxanthine. Many metabolites, in addition to caffeine, act within the body and are partly responsible for the physiological response to caffeine.

== Mechanism of caffeine action ==
Caffeine acts in multiple ways within the brain and the rest of the body. However, due to the concentration of caffeine required, antagonism of adenosine receptors is the primary mode of action. The following mechanisms are ways in which caffeine may act within the body, but depending on necessary caffeine concentration and other factors may not be responsible for the clinical effects of the substance.

=== Mobilization of intracellular calcium ===
At very high concentrations of about 1–2 mM, caffeine lowers the excitability threshold in muscle cells, leading to prolonged contraction. The introduction of such high doses of caffeine allows calcium to enter the muscle cell through the plasma membrane and sarcoplasmic reticulum more readily. Influx of calcium through the membranes in muscle cells requires at least 250 μM of caffeine. Normally, other toxic effects of caffeine begin to occur in concentrations over 200 μM, however average consumption averages lead to concentrations less than 100 μM. This means that calcium influx and mobilization are most likely not responsible for caffeine's effects on the central nervous system and, therefore, are not the cause of caffeine-induced anxiety disorder.

=== Inhibition of phosphodiesterases ===
Methylxanthines such as caffeine inhibit the action of cyclic nucleotide phosphodiesterase, which normally acts to break down cAMP. Cyclic adenosine monophosphate, or cAMP, is a second messenger important in many cellular processes and is a critical factor in signal transduction. The inhibition of the phosphodiesterase would lead to a buildup of cAMP, increasing the activity of the second messenger throughout the cell. Though this mechanism is possible, it only occurs after levels of caffeine have reached a toxic level, and therefore it is unlikely to explain the mechanism of caffeine in the brain.

=== Antagonism of adenosine receptors ===
There are four well-known adenosine receptors found in the body, A_{1}, A_{2A}, A_{2B}, and A_{3}. The endogenous agonist for these receptors is adenosine, which is a purine nucleoside that is important for processes such as energy transfer in the form of adenosine triphosphate (ATP) and adenosine monophosphate (AMP) and signal transduction in the form of cyclic adenosine monophosphate (cAMP). A_{2B} and A_{3} receptors require concentrations of caffeine that do not occur at normal physiological levels or with normal levels of caffeine consumption in order to be antagonized, and will therefore not be considered as a possible mechanism for caffeine-induced anxiety.

Caffeine acts as an antagonist of adenosine A_{1} and A_{2A} receptors. Adenosine is a normal neuromodulator that activates adenosine g-protein coupled receptors. The actions of A_{1} and A_{2A} receptors oppose each other but are both inhibited by caffeine due to its function as an antagonist.

A_{2A} receptors are coupled to G_{s} proteins which activate adenylate cyclase and some voltage gated Ca^{2+} channels. A_{2A} receptors are located in dopamine rich brain regions. A_{2A} receptor mRNA was found in the same neurons as the dopamine receptor D_{2} within the dorsal striatum, nucleus accumbens and tuberculum olfactorium. A_{2A} receptors are not found in neurons that express the dopamine receptor D_{1} receptors and Substance P. Within the striatum, part of the basal ganglia, activation of A_{2A} receptors by adenosine increases GABA release, an inhibitory neurotransmitter. When caffeine binds to the receptor, less inhibitory neurotransmitter is released, supporting caffeine's role as a central nervous system stimulant.

A_{1} receptors are paired with the G-proteins of G_{i-1}, G_{i-2}, G_{i-3}, G_{o1}, and G_{o2}. The g-proteins of A_{1} receptors continue to inhibit adenylate cyclase, some voltage gated Ca^{2+} channels, and activate some K^{+} channels, and phospholipase C and D. A_{1} receptors are primarily located in the hippocampus, cerebral and cerebellar cortex, and particular thalamic nuclei. Adenosine acts on A_{1} receptors to decrease opening of N-type Ca^{2+} channels in some hippocampal neurons, and therefore decrease the rate of firing since Ca^{2+} is necessary for neurotransmitter release. Caffeine's antagonistic action on the A_{1} receptor thus decreases the action of adenosine, allowing increased Ca^{2+} entry through N-type channels and higher rates of neurotransmitter release.

=== Other actions of caffeine ===
Though antagonism of adenosine receptors is the primary mechanism of caffeine, introduction of the methylxanthine into the body also increases the rate of release and recycling of some monoamine neurotransmitters, such as noradrenaline and dopamine. Caffeine also has an excitatory effect on mesocortical cholinergic neurons by acting as an antagonist on adenosine receptors that normally inhibit the neuron.

== Genetics and variability of caffeine consumption ==
While many factors contribute to individual differences in a person's response to caffeine, such as environmental and demographic factors (i.e. age, drug use, circadian factors, etc.), genetics play an important role in individual variability. This inconsistency in responses to caffeine can take place either at the metabolic or at the drug-receptor level. The effects of genetic factors can occur either directly by changing acute or chronic reactions to the drug or indirectly by altering other psychological or physiological processes.

Some of these processes include wakefulness, stimulation, and mood and cognition enhancement. Low doses can result in psychological effects of "mild euphoria, alertness, and enhanced cognitive performance"; higher doses produce physiological side effects of nausea, anxiety, trembling, and jitteriness.

Some individuals are prone to caffeine's anxiogenic effects, whereas others are susceptible to its caffeine-induced sleep disturbances and insomnia. Studies with twins have shown that genetics influence individual differences in response to caffeine. Homozygous twins have been found to react in more consistent ways to the caffeine than heterozygous twins.

== Behavioral effects ==
Caffeine's widespread appeal is due primarily to its mild psychostimulant properties, which increase alertness and cognitive arousal and diminish fatigue. Caffeine also produces a wide range of other symptoms, including upregulation of the cardiovascular system, increased global cognitive processing, and improved physical functioning. Cardiovascular effects can range from increased heart rate and reactivity to severe cardiac arrhythmia. The cognitive effects of caffeine include increased performance in memory, attention, and text reading. The physical effects of caffeine include lowered sensations of pain, less perceived effort, and increased muscle strength and endurance. However, at doses above ~400 mg, both cognitive and physical performance begins to worsen and symptoms of anxiety increase. One study that explored ad lib caffeine consumption in 159 college students found that high consumers reported lower academic performance. The same study also concluded that moderate and high consumers combined reported significantly higher trait anxiety and depression scores when compared with abstainers. These anxiety symptoms include persisting insomnia, nervousness, and mood fluctuations.

When undergoing stress, the body activates a system-wide response mechanism known as the HPA axis. This stress signal begins at the level of the hypothalamus in the brain and undergoes subsequent amplifications throughout the body. This system elevates levels of stress hormones in the blood, which results in the body shutting down secondary bodily processes and increasing alertness to better prepare for response to the perceived threat. Studies show that activation of this pathway is correlated with anxiety-like behaviors, including panic, post-traumatic stress, and generalized anxiety disorders, as well as depression. Rodent studies show that caffeine consumption in adolescence results in dysregulation of HPA axis function as well as central nervous system response, which impairs the body's response to stressful stimuli.

In cases of prolonged consumption of excess amounts of caffeine, studies show that individuals exhibit a reduced response to HPA axis activation by the hormone ACTH and a generalized increase in basal levels of stress hormone corticosterone. Researchers concluded that the sensitivity of adrenal glands to ACTH is diminished by caffeine consumption. People diagnosed with panic disorder show less HPA activity following stressful stimuli than their healthy control counterparts.

== Susceptible populations ==
Caffeine has varying effects on anxiety across given populations. The populations most susceptible to caffeine-induced anxiety disorder include those already diagnosed with an anxiety disorder and adolescents. Adolescents, particularly, are at increased risk for developing anxiety disorders and anxiety-related symptoms. While few human studies have been done to investigate this connection, many rodent studies show a correlation between caffeine consumption in adolescence and increased anxiety. These studies showed that in adolescent rodents exposed to caffeine, functioning of serotonin systems was affected, leading to increased anxiety; anxiety-related behaviors were higher than in adult rats exposed to the same amount of caffeine; and reward seeking behaviors as well as mood fluctuations were increased as the rodents matured. Rats with high anxiety behavior when exposed to a high dose of caffeine decreased their risk taking as well as the expression of neurite growth signal BDNF in caudate putamen, compared to low anxiety behavior rats.

== Long-term health effects ==
When consumed in moderation, caffeine can have many beneficial effects. However, over the course of several years, chronic caffeine consumption can produce various long-term health deficits in individuals. Among these, rodent studies have suggested caffeine intake may permanently alter the brain's excitability.

== Treatment ==
For individuals being treated with benzodiazepines such as alprazolam (Xanax) for anxiety disorders, even small amounts of caffeine may have negative effects on treatment. Caffeine is able to negate the effects of benzodiazepines which can lead to heightened levels of anxiety and even panic attacks. Studies have linked caffeine intake to increased rates of cytotoxicity and cell death by necrosis associated with benzodiazepine use. However, this phenomenon (thought to be mediated via TSPO) is also present with benzodiazepine use alone. The clinical significance of caffeine-benzodiazepine induced cytotoxicity in humans is unclear and has not been shown to be harmful. Although benzodiazepines are effective at managing acute caffeine-induced anxiety symptoms, avoiding caffeine is generally recommended rather than increasing benzodiazepine intake. Treatments for caffeine-induced anxiety disorder tend to focus on abstinence from or a reduction of caffeine intake and behavioral therapy. Some doctors may recommend a continuance of caffeine consumption but with the provision that the patient actively takes note of physiological changes that happen after caffeine intake. The goal of this approach is to help patients better understand the effects of caffeine on the body and to distinguish threatening symptoms from normal reactions.
