= Caffeine-induced sleep disorder =

Inability to sleep due to overconsumption of caffeine

- Specialty: Psychiatry

Caffeine-induced sleep disorder was a psychiatric disorder identified as resulting from overconsumption of the stimulant caffeine.

Caffeine is one of the most widely consumed psychoactive drugs: almost 90% of Americans in a survey consume some type of caffeine each day. "When caffeine is consumed immediately before bedtime or .... throughout the day, sleep onset may be delayed, total sleep time reduced, normal stages of sleep altered, and the quality of sleep decreased." Caffeine reduces slow-wave sleep in the early part of the sleep cycle and can reduce rapid eye movement sleep later in the cycle. Caffeine increases episodes of wakefulness, and high doses in the late evening can increase sleep onset latency. In elderly people, there is an association between use of medication containing caffeine and difficulty in falling asleep.

== Official recognition and past criteria ==
The latest Diagnostic and Statistical Manual of Mental Disorders, DSM-5, does not include caffeine-induced sleep disorder. It does have "Other Caffeine-Induced Disorders" and "Unspecified Caffeine-Related Disorder" which may have linkage with caffeine use.

Previously DSM-IV included criteria for the disorder that there must be a significant inability to sleep which is caused entirely by the physiological effects of caffeine as proven by an examination; if sleeping issues can be accounted for due to a breathing-related sleep disorder, narcolepsy, a circadian rhythm sleep disorder or a mental disorder, then caffeine-induced sleep disorder was not the cause. This condition was seen as causing a notable impairment in functioning.

Similarly the latest International Classification of Diseases, ICD-11, does not include a specific sleep-related caffeine disorder, but does include "sleep-wake disorders" under "Disorders due to use of caffeine, unspecified".

== Caffeine and age ==
Most studies now, find that there is relatively no association between caffeine and its effects on sleep for infants. There was very little difference between mothers who had high caffeine consumption during pregnancy as opposed to mothers who did not have high consumption of caffeine during their pregnancy.

Caffeine in younger children has been found to shorten their sleep duration and increase daytime sleepiness. One study, which looked at children ages six to ten years of age, found that those who consistently consumed caffeine lost about 15 minutes of sleep each night. In most cases where younger children are drinking high amounts of caffeine, parents usually buy their children soft drinks, iced tea, or energy drinks without realizing the amount of caffeine these drinks contain or the implications they have on their children.

30% of adolescent adults in a survey were found to consume caffeine daily. Individuals with higher caffeine consumption, tended to feel an increase in wakefulness after sleep onset, shorter sleep durations, and longer daytime sleep. Those who consumed high amounts of caffeine daily, were found to be 1.9 times more likely to have difficulty sleeping and 1.8 times more likely to feel sleepy in the morning compared to those who consume almost no caffeine. Individuals with higher caffeine consumption felt an increase in wakefulness after sleep onset, shorter sleep durations, and longer daytime sleep. The higher consumption time for adolescent adults tends to be on the weekends, while the lowest consumption is midweek. This is assumed to be from greater social opportunities among adolescence.

== Mechanism of caffeine ==
Caffeine is an adenosine receptor antagonist. This means that caffeine mainly works by occupying adenosine receptors in the brain, specifically, receptors that influence sleep, arousal, and cognition. Once it is in the body, caffeine will persist for several hours, and takes about six hours for one half of the caffeine consumed to be eliminated. When caffeine reaches the brain, it increases the secretion of norepinephrine which is related to the "fight or flight" response. The rise in norepinephrine levels increases activity of neurons in areas of the brain and the symptoms resemble those of a panic attack.

The half-life of caffeine is roughly 3–4 hours in healthy adults, however, it is dependent on a variety of variables such as age, liver function, medications, level of enzymes, pregnancy. This short half-life has been found to help out daytime functioning, but increase the side effect of sleep problems. So, while caffeine has the potential to increase performance, it comes at a cost of sleep deprivation which in its own way can counter the main point of caffeine. Sleep deprivation alone can cause a variety of problems associated with cognitive control and functions. This can include reduced alertness, attention, vigilance, speed of motor functions.

Though caffeine can be shown to decrease the quality of sleep, there is no evidence that caffeine affects all people the same way. In fact, some people report no sleep problems despite regularly consuming caffeine. Regular intake of caffeine may be normal for a person so it is understandable how they may still get satisfactory sleep. This finding shows that caffeine interferes with a modulatory mechanism in sleep regulation rather than a fundamental sleep regulatory brain circuit. Ultimately, regular sleep habits are important in overall quality and timing of sleep.

== Caffeine consumption ==
=== Overconsumption ===
Although the maximum daily consumption of caffeine varies with consideration of couple of aspects such as sex, age, race, physical activity and smoking, excessive ingestion of caffeine can lead to a state of intoxication. This period of intoxication is characterized by restlessness, agitation, excitement, rambling thought or speech, and even insomnia. Even doses of caffeine relating to just one cup of coffee can increase sleep latency and decrease the quality of sleep especially in non-REM deep sleep. A dose of caffeine taken in the morning can have these effects the following night, so one of the main practices of sleep hygiene a person can do is to cease the consumption of caffeine.

=== Moderation ===
Keeping in mind that caffeine content in beverages and food varies and that some individuals are more sensitive to caffeine consumption than others are, moderation of caffeine is key. Between 200 and 300 mg of caffeine is considered "moderate" for most adults. While children can consume caffeine, it is advised to refrain children and adolescents from consuming caffeine due to their growing brains and to allow them to develop healthy sleep patterns.

== Consequences of sleep disruption ==
Normal healthy sleep is described as having sufficient duration, quality, timing, regulation, and the absence of sleep disturbances or disorders. Even though the suggested amounts of sleep is relatively well known, there are increasing high numbers in the lack of healthy and good quality sleep.

Risk factors of sleep can range across many different arrays such as environmental, lifestyle, psychosocial, sleep disorders, or medical conditions. These are all circumstances which put individuals at risk for sleep disruption. Environmental risk factors for sleep disruption can include living in an area where there is excessive noise such as near an interstate, keeping an individual up later than normal. A lifestyle risk factor would include drinking alcohol, drug abuse, or a late shift at work. Psychosocial risk factors include being a caregiver for someone who needs constant attention, parents of young children, anxiety, worry, or stress, etc.

Sleep plays an essential part in brain functions and has crucial implications across almost all body systems. Numerous studies have shown caffeine consumption to heavily disrupt sleep patterns. This can lead to other implications such as lengthening the onset of sleep latency and decrease the efficiency and duration of sleep. Disruption of sleep also affects pressure for sleep and lowers electroencephalogram power in the frontal, central, and parietal regions of the brain. Short-term consequences of sleep disruption include: an increase in stress, emotional distress, mood and other mental health problems, cognition, memory, and performance deficits as well as an increase in behavioral problems in normally heathy individuals. Long-term consequences of sleep disruption include: cardiovascular problems such as cardiovascular disease, hypertension, higher concentration of fats in the body, weight issues such as metabolic syndrome, increased likelihood of cancer, and gastrointestinal disorders.
