= MSX-2 =

Selective adenosine A2A receptor antagonist

Clinical data
- Other names: 3-(3-Hydroxypropyl)-7-methyl-8-(3-methoxystyryl)-1-propargylxanthine
- Drug class: Adenosine A_{2A} receptor antagonist

Identifiers
- IUPAC name: 3-(3-hydroxypropyl)-8-[(E)-2-(3-methoxyphenyl)ethenyl]-7-methyl-1-prop-2-ynylpurine-2,6-dione
- CAS Number: 261717-18-4
- PubChem CID: 10046145
- IUPHAR/BPS: 5610
- ChemSpider: 8221708
- ChEMBL: ChEMBL413079
- CompTox Dashboard (EPA): DTXSID50434735

Chemical and physical data
- Formula: C_{21}H_{22}N_{4}O_{4}
- Molar mass: 394.431 g·mol^{−1}
- 3D model (JSmol): Interactive image
- SMILES: CN1C(=NC2=C1C(=O)N(C(=O)N2CCCO)CC#C)/C=C/C3=CC(=CC=C3)OC
- InChI: InChI=1S/C21H22N4O4/c1-4-11-25-20(27)18-19(24(21(25)28)12-6-13-26)22-17(23(18)2)10-9-15-7-5-8-16(14-15)29-3/h1,5,7-10,14,26H,6,11-13H2,2-3H3/b10-9+; Key:FWLDDFYHEQMIGG-MDZDMXLPSA-N

MSX-2 is a selective adenosine A_{2A} receptor antagonist used in scientific research. It is a xanthine and a derivative of the non-selective adenosine receptor antagonist caffeine.

The affinities (K_{i}) of MSX-2 for the human adenosine receptors are 5.38 to 14.5 nM for the adenosine A_{2A} receptor, 2,500 nM for the adenosine A_{1} receptor (172- to 465-fold lower than for the A_{2A} receptor), and >10,000 nM for the adenosine A_{2B} and A_{3} receptors (>690-fold lower than for the A_{2A} receptor).

MSX-2 has poor water solubility, which has limited the use of MSX-2 itself. Water-soluble ester prodrugs of MSX-2, including MSX-3 (a phosphate ester prodrug) and MSX-4 (an amino acid ester prodrug), have been developed and used in place of MSX-2. MSX-3 is best-suited for use by intravenous administration, whereas MSX-4 can be administered by oral administration.

MSX-3 and MSX-4 reverse motivational deficits in animals and hence have the capacity to produce pro-motivational effects.

MSX-2 and MSX-3 were first described in the scientific literature by 1998. Subsequently, MSX-4 was developed and described by 2008.

== See also ==
- 3-Chlorostyrylcaffeine
- Istradefylline
- Preladenant
