= Adenosine receptor agonist =

Class of drugs

An adenosine receptor agonist is a drug which acts as an agonist of one or more of the adenosine receptors. Examples include the neurotransmitter adenosine, its phosphates, adenosine monophosphate (AMP), adenosine diphosphate (ADP), and adenosine triphosphate (ATP), and the pharmaceutical drug regadenoson.

== List of adenosine receptor agonists ==
- ATL146e (A2A selective)
- PD81,723 (A1 allosteric enhancer)
- CF102 (Adenosine A3 receptor)
- Rosmarinic acid (A1 agonist)
- 5′-(N-Ethylcarboxamido)adenosine (NECA)

== See also ==
- Adenosine receptor antagonist
- Adenosine reuptake inhibitor
