= 3-Chlorostyrylcaffeine =

Adenosine A2A receptor antagonist and MAO-B inhibitor

Clinical data
- Other names: CSC; 8-CSC; 8-(3-Chlorostyryl)caffeine; 8-(3-Chlorostyryl)-1,3,7-trimethylxanthine
- Drug class: Adenosine A_{2A} receptor antagonist

Identifiers
- IUPAC name: 1-[3-(3-chlorophenyl)prop-2-enyl]-3,7-dimethylpurine-2,6-dione
- CAS Number: 147700-11-6
- PubChem CID: 129730232
- ChemSpider: 4510063

Chemical and physical data
- Formula: C_{16}H_{15}ClN_{4}O_{2}
- Molar mass: 330.77 g·mol^{−1}
- 3D model (JSmol): Interactive image
- SMILES: CN1C=NC2=C1C(=O)N(C(=O)N2C)CC=CC3=CC(=CC=C3)Cl
- InChI: InChI=1S/C16H15ClN4O2/c1-19-10-18-14-13(19)15(22)21(16(23)20(14)2)8-4-6-11-5-3-7-12(17)9-11/h3-7,9-10H,8H2,1-2H3; Key:VYLMWABBINHTEH-UHFFFAOYSA-N

3-Chlorostyrylcaffeine (CSC), or 8-(3-chlorostyryl)caffeine (8-CSC), is a potent and selective adenosine A_{2A} receptor antagonist which is used in scientific research.

It has 520-fold selectivity for the adenosine A_{2A} receptor over the adenosine A_{1} receptor (K_{i} = 54 nM and 28,000 nM for the rat receptors, respectively). Its affinities for the adenosine A_{2B} and A_{3} receptors are similarly low (K_{i} = 8,200 nM and >10,000 nM, respectively).

CSC has been found to reverse the catalepsy induced by the dopamine D_{1} receptor antagonist SCH-23390 and the dopamine D_{2} receptor antagonists raclopride and sulpiride in animals.

The drug was one of the first selective adenosine A_{2A} receptor antagonists to be developed. However, in addition to its adenosine receptor antagonism, CSC was subsequently found to be a potent monoamine oxidase B (MAO-B) inhibitor (K_{i} = 80.6 nM for baboon MAO-B). CSC was first described in the scientific literature by 1993.

== See also ==
- DMPX
- Istradefylline
- MSX-3
