= Lu AA41063 =

Selective adenosine A2A receptor antagonist

Clinical data
- Drug class: Adenosine A_{2A} receptor antagonist

Identifiers
- IUPAC name: 4-(3,3-dimethylbutanoylamino)-3,5-difluoro-N-(1,3-thiazol-2-yl)benzamide
- CAS Number: 851202-49-8
- PubChem CID: 16122818
- ChemSpider: 17279728
- ChEMBL: ChEMBL1671936
- CompTox Dashboard (EPA): DTXSID001352436

Chemical and physical data
- Formula: C_{16}H_{17}F_{2}N_{3}O_{2}S
- Molar mass: 353.39 g·mol^{−1}
- 3D model (JSmol): Interactive image
- SMILES: CC(C)(C)CC(=O)NC1=C(C=C(C=C1F)C(=O)NC2=NC=CS2)F
- InChI: InChI=1S/C16H17F2N3O2S/c1-16(2,3)8-12(22)20-13-10(17)6-9(7-11(13)18)14(23)21-15-19-4-5-24-15/h4-7H,8H2,1-3H3,(H,20,22)(H,19,21,23); Key:KEUJAGGJGBWRFC-UHFFFAOYSA-N

Lu AA41063 is a selective adenosine A_{2A} receptor antagonist. Structurally, it is a non-xanthine.

The affinities (K_{i}) of the drug for the human adenosine receptors are 5.9 nM for the adenosine A_{2A} receptor, 410 nM for the adenosine A_{1} receptor (69-fold lower than for the A_{2A} receptor), 260 nM for the adenosine A_{2B} receptor (44-fold lower than for the A_{2A} receptor), and >10,000 nM for the adenosine A_{3} receptor (>1,695-fold lower than for the A_{2A} receptor).

Lu AA41063 was first described in the scientific literature by 2014.

Lu AA47070, a water-soluble phosphate ester prodrug of Lu AA41063, is orally active and was under development for the treatment of Parkinson's disease but was discontinued. In addition to its antiparkinsonian-like effects, Lu AA47070 reverses motivational deficits in animals and hence shows pro-motivational effects.
