= MSX-3 =

Selective adenosine A2A receptor antagonist used in scientific research

Clinical data
- Drug class: Adenosine A_{2A} receptor antagonist

Identifiers
- IUPAC name: 3-[8-[(E)-2-(3-methoxyphenyl)ethenyl]-7-methyl-2,6-dioxo-1-prop-2-ynylpurin-3-yl]propyl dihydrogen phosphate
- CAS Number: 261705-79-7
- PubChem CID: 10256042
- ChemSpider: 8431526
- UNII: 72MRN83M4A
- ChEMBL: ChEMBL1205720

Chemical and physical data
- Formula: C_{21}H_{23}N_{4}O_{7}P
- Molar mass: 474.410 g·mol^{−1}
- 3D model (JSmol): Interactive image
- SMILES: CN1C(=NC2=C1C(=O)N(C(=O)N2CCCOP(=O)(O)O)CC#C)/C=C/C3=CC(=CC=C3)OC
- InChI: InChI=1S/C21H23N4O7P/c1-4-11-25-20(26)18-19(24(21(25)27)12-6-13-32-33(28,29)30)22-17(23(18)2)10-9-15-7-5-8-16(14-15)31-3/h1,5,7-10,14H,6,11-13H2,2-3H3,(H2,28,29,30)/b10-9+; Key:DUCGTTGSVYZHJS-MDZDMXLPSA-N

MSX-3 is a selective adenosine A_{2A} receptor antagonist used in scientific research. Similarly to MSX-4, it is a water-soluble ester prodrug of MSX-2.

== Medicinal chemistry ==
MSX-3, MSX-4, and MSX-2 are xanthines and are derivatives of the non-selective adenosine receptor antagonist caffeine. MSX-2 has been extensively studied due to its high affinity and selectivity for the adenosine A_{2A} receptor, but use of MSX-2 itself has been limited by its poor water solubility.

Whereas MSX-3 is a phosphate ester prodrug of MSX-2 that is suited best for intravenous administration and not for oral administration, MSX-4 is an amino acid ester (L-valine) prodrug of MSX-2 that can be orally administered.

== Pharmacology ==
MSX-2 has 500-fold higher affinity for the adenosine A_{2A} receptor over the adenosine A_{1} receptor, 580-fold higher affinity for the adenosine A_{2A} receptor over the adenosine A_{2B} receptor, and is inactive at the adenosine A_{3} receptor.

MSX-3 itself also showed some affinity for the adenosine receptors, but this may have just been due to degradation by phosphatases in the in vitro system.

== Animal studies ==
MSX-3 shows pro-motivational effects in animals. Specifically, although it showed no effect on its own, the drug reverses the effort-related deficits induced by the dopamine depleting agent tetrabenazine (TBZ), the dopamine D_{2} receptor antagonists haloperidol and eticlopride, and the proinflammatory cytokines interleukin-6 and interleukin-1β.

Conversely, it only mildly attenuates the motivational deficits induced by the dopamine D_{1} receptor antagonist ecopipam (SCH-39166).

== History ==
MSX-3 was first described in the scientific literature by 1998. A similar agent, MSX-4, was subsequently described by 2008.
