= Preladenant =

Chemical compound

Clinical data
- Other names: SCH-420814
- Routes of administration: By mouth
- ATC code: none

Legal status
- Legal status: Investigational

Identifiers
- IUPAC name: 2-(2-Furanyl)-7-[2-[4-[4-(2-methoxyethoxy)phenyl]-1-piperazinyl]ethyl]7H-pyrazolo[4,3-e][1,2,4]triazolo[1,5-c]pyrimidine-5-amine
- CAS Number: 377727-87-2
- PubChem CID: 10117987
- IUPHAR/BPS: 5614
- ChemSpider: 8293510
- UNII: 950O97NUPO
- KEGG: D09717
- CompTox Dashboard (EPA): DTXSID90191219
- ECHA InfoCard: 100.210.813

Chemical and physical data
- Formula: C_{25}H_{29}N_{9}O_{3}
- Molar mass: 503.567 g·mol^{−1}
- 3D model (JSmol): Interactive image
- SMILES: COCCOc(cc4)ccc4N(CC3)CCN3CCn(c2nc1N)ncc2c(n5)n1nc5-c6occc6
- InChI: InChI=1S/C25H29N9O3/c1-35-15-16-36-19-6-4-18(5-7-19)32-11-8-31(9-12-32)10-13-33-23-20(17-27-33)24-28-22(21-3-2-14-37-21)30-34(24)25(26)29-23/h2-7,14,17H,8-13,15-16H2,1H3,(H2,26,29); Key:DTYWJKSSUANMHD-UHFFFAOYSA-N

Preladenant (developmental code name SCH-420814) is a drug that was developed by Schering-Plough which acts as a potent and selective antagonist of the adenosine A_{2A} receptor. It was being researched as a potential treatment for Parkinson's disease. Positive results were reported in Phase II clinical trials in humans, but it did not prove itself to be more effective than a placebo during Phase III trials, and so was discontinued in May 2013.

The drug has very high affinity for the A_{2A} receptor (<1 nM) and shows more than 1,000-fold selectivity for the A_{2A} receptor over the other adenosine receptors.

Preladenant shows pro-motivational effects in animals and reverses tetrabenazine-induced motivational deficits. Other A_{2A} receptor antagonists, including istradefylline, Lu AA47070, MSX-3, and MSX-4, have also shown such effects. These agents may be useful in the treatment of motivational disorders in humans. Accordingly, istradefylline has been reported to reduce apathy, anhedonia, fatigue, and depression in people with Parkinson's disease.

== See also ==
- List of investigational Parkinson's disease drugs
