= Adenosine A2A receptor antagonist =

Class of drugs

Adenosine A_{2A} receptor antagonists are a class of drugs that block adenosine at the adenosine A_{2A} receptor. Notable adenosine A_{2A} receptor antagonists include caffeine, theophylline and istradefylline.

== Clinical significance ==
Adenosine A_{2A} receptor locations in the body could help us to understand the possible therapeutic applications in the future. They can be found in the lungs, white blood cells, sympathetic nervous system, striatum, tuberculum olfactorium, coronary, lymphatic, brain and other blood vessels, platelets and kidneys. Most of the therapeutic applications are connected to agonists, but the main focus with antagonists are diseases connected to motor skills, learning and memory, for example Parkinson's and Alzheimer's.

Recently, selective A_{2A} receptor antagonists are used in treatment of diseases such as Parkinson's disease, ischemia, and multiple sclerosis. Selective A_{2A} receptor antagonists are believed to be neuroprotectors for their ability to reduce neuroinflammation.

=== Parkinson's disease ===
The degradation of dopaminergic neurons in the nigrostriatal pathway is the cause of the motor symptoms of Parkinson's disease. Several other areas in the brain and other neurotransmitters such as noradrenaline, 5-hydroxytryptamine and acetylcholine are affected in the disease. The etiology of Parkinson's disease is still uncertain, but it is believed that the progressive degeneration of dopaminergic neurons is connected with chronic neuroinflammation and the key factor in this process is microglia activation.

Despite the therapies targeting dopamine being effective on Parkinson's-related motor disturbances, they produce undesirable side effects, such as dyskinesia and hallucinations. These side effects become more severe with continued treatment. Selective A_{2A} receptor antagonists have shown to be beneficial for enhancing the therapeutic effects of L-DOPA and reducing dyskinesia from long-term L-DOPA treatment. Trial results indicated that the viability of A_{2A} receptor antagonists have potential advantages over the current standard treatments for Parkinson's disease.

Several xanthines and non-xanthines are under development as potential anti-parkinsonism agents, which are selective for A_{2A} receptors. Recently, the A_{2A} receptor antagonist 3-chlorostyrylcaffeine has been reported to be a potent inhibitor of monoamine oxidase B.

An inverse relationship between non-selective adenosine receptor antagonists, the consumption of caffeine and the risk of developing Parkinson's disease has been indicated from epidemiological studies.

=== Other diseases ===
A_{2A} receptor antagonists may prevent hepatic cirrhosis, and pentoxifylline may inhibit phosphodiesterase and provide renal protection.

The A_{2A} receptor antagonists may be used for treatment of attention deficit hyperactivity disorder (ADHD), because of the receptors ability to regulate neurotransmission in the basal ganglia and cortex, particularly dopaminergic and glutamatergic signaling.

The blockade of A_{2A} receptors has potentially shown to be protective in several tumor models, through pharmacological inhibition or genetic deletion. Some effects were found to be due to enhanced activity of natural killer cells and also due to enhanced efficacy of anti-PD-1 and anti-CTLA4 antibodies.

In recent studies, the consumption of caffeine-containing beverages and a certain non-xanthine A_{2A} receptor antagonist appear to possibly have some protective effects from Alzheimer's disease.

== Development ==
Similar to other G protein-coupled receptors, A_{2A} receptors form both homo- and heterodimers. The presence of heterodimeric complexes has progressed in suggesting new ways to regulate neuronal activity by targeting the A_{2A} receptor.

In spite of the efforts to identify potent compounds, challenges still remain in achieving selectivity, solubility and acceptable pharmacokinetic or pharmacodynamic properties of the potent compounds and for it to progress into the clinic.

It was not until 1981 when the underlying targets involved in the behavioral stimulant properties of methylxanthines (such as caffeine) were recognized. The stimulant properties of caffeine and various analogs were correlated with the blockade of adenosine receptors. It was proposed that the cause of behavioral depression was due to inhibition of cyclic nucleotide phosphodiesterases when taking high doses of caffeine and some xanthine analogs. It was clear that ligands of adenosine receptors and inhibitors for phosphodiesterase were targets for drug development.

In 1992, the therapeutic potential for both agonists and antagonists of the adenosine receptors was highlighted for A_{2} receptors, and in 2001 the therapeutic potential for adenosine antagonists was highlighted. Broad reviews from 2006 have been focusing on adenosine receptors as therapeutic targets, adenosine receptor antagonists as potential therapeutics, antagonist for A_{2A}-receptors, adenosine receptor ligands as anti-inflammatories and many more.

Several attempts have been made by using virtual screening to identify potent A_{2A} adenosine receptor antagonists. Both docking-based screening using protein structures obtained from homology modeling and experimental determination of crystal structures of the A_{2A} adenosine receptor are used to identify the potent compounds.

Caffeine is a non-selective A_{2A} antagonist. Replacing one or two of the methyl groups with propyl or propargyl increases the selectivity towards the receptor.

=== Caffeine ===
Caffeine is classified as a non-selective adenosine receptor antagonist. Epidemiological and laboratory data are interpreting that consuming caffeine and coffee are linked to a reduced risk of developing Parkinson's disease. It is unresolved what caffeine's mechanism is on parkinsonian effects. It is believed it acts as an adenosine A_{2A} receptor neutral antagonist or as an inverse agonist. Caffeine's A_{2A} receptor inverse agonism may be the cause of the well-known physiological effects of this substance.

=== Theophylline ===
Theophylline is a non-selective adenosine receptor antagonist. It is also an anti-asthmatic agent and a demethylated metabolite of caffeine. Small open-label trials suggest that theophylline has anti-parkinsonian benefit but a double-blind, placebo-controlled trial did not clearly establish relief from symptoms.

=== Istradefylline ===
Istradefylline

Istradefylline, under the brand name Nourianz®, has been approved by the U.S. Food and Drug Administration. Nourianz® are tablets used as an add-on treatment with a Levodopa/Carbidopa treatment.

Istradefylline is a A_{2A} receptor antagonist which increases motor activity and decreases dyskinesia caused by a prolonged administration of L-DOPA and when added to dopamine agonists, it produced synergistic effects.

== Mechanism of action ==
Adenosine is a neuromodulator that is responsible for motor function, mood, memory, and learning. Its main purpose is the coordination of responses to different neurotransmitters. Adenosine plays many important roles in biological systems, for example in the central nervous-, cardiovascular-, hepatic-, renal- and respiratory system. Adenosine plays a role in inflammatory response. Adenosine is released subsequent an inflammation and it prevents tissue damage by reducing inflammation.

A_{2A} receptors are G-protein coupled receptor (GPCR) that increases cyclic adenosine monophosphate (cAMP). These receptors are mainly expressed in the brain. After almost a century of receptor research, the adenosine A_{2A} receptor has been selected as a possible research target for various medical conditions. Antagonists of the receptor have been researched, especially as an enhancer for the therapeutic effects of L-DOPA in Parkinson's treatment.

Certain evidence points to adenosine A_{2A} receptor antagonism functioning in a neuroprotective manner in the brain. This effect has been noted for both non-selective and selective adenosine A_{2A} receptor antagonists. This neuroprotective function is the manner in which A_{2A} receptor antagonists might help to prevent diseases such as Alzheimer's, Parkinson's and Multiple sclerosis. It is still not entirely understood how this neuroprotective action comes about. It has however been hypothesized, that the attenuation of overactive glutamate overflow and reduction of oxidative stress might be the reason for it.

A_{2A} receptor antagonists also appear to function against Parkinson's disease by modulating GABA release, and by decreasing dopamine-c-Fos activation in the striatopallidal pathway. They are also able to potentiate D2 receptor control of glutamatergic transmission presynaptically – a process which is dysfunctional in Parkinson's disease.

== Structure activity relationship (SAR) ==
Establishing the relationship between structure and efficacy for ligands of adenosine receptors has proven to be a challenge. In order to be able to characterize the function of adenosine A_{2} receptors, potent and selective A_{2}-receptor antagonists were required. Various chemical scaffolds of different SAR properties have been reported that show dramatic differences in activity once certain modifications are made.

In order to achieve high affinity at adenosine receptors, certain criteria must be fulfilled. Adenosine receptor antagonists, in general, are:

1. Flat
2. Aromatic or π-electron rich
3. Nitrogen-containing heterocycles, which are often 6:5 fused

Substituting hydrophobic groups (such as CH_{3} or other alkyl chains) on to the compound has the potential to enhance affinity to the receptor, while adding hydrophilic groups (such as N, S, O or OH) is usually suboptimal. This leads to most of the antagonists of the highest affinity being largely insoluble in water. A_{2A} agonists usually have a sugar moiety, which A_{2A} antagonist in general lack. They do, however, usually have a mono-, bi- or tricyclic structure which looks much the same as adenine, the main constituent of adenosine. A_{2A} antagonists have been classified as xanthines and non-xanthines. Caffeine and theophylline (found in coffee and tea, respectively) are examples of well-known xanthines, which act as nonselective A_{2A} antagonists. Both substances act as stimulants, and these properties can be associated with their blockade of the adenosine A_{2A} receptor - for which they have an affinity in the micromolar range.

Core structure of xanthine based adenosine A_{2A} antagonists

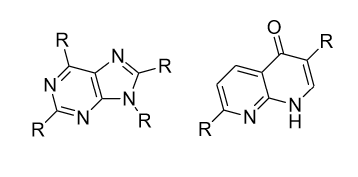
These are two examples of core structures of bicyclic non-xanthine based A_{2A} adenosine antagonists. There can be different numbers of N in the core cycles and R can be, for example: S, O, NR, NH_{2} and more.

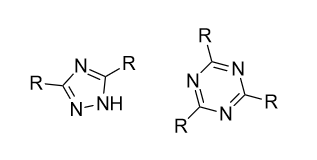
These are two examples of core structures of monocyclic non xanthine based A_{2A} adenosine antagonists. There can be different numbers of N in the core cycle and R can be, for example: S, O, NR, NH_{2} and more.

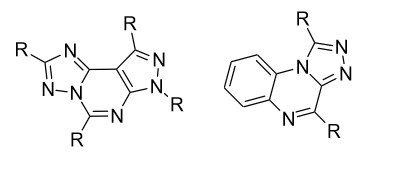
These are two examples of core structures of tricyclic non xanthine based A_{2A} adenosine antagonists. There can be different numbers of N in the core cycles and R can be, for example: S, O, NR, NH_{2} and more. The pentagon can also be in the middle of two hexagons.

Several pharmacological limitations are known for xanthine derivatives, such as poor water solubility. Rapid photoisomerization has been observed for the side chain olefin of istradefylline after being exposed to daylight in dilute solutions. Challenges remain for the desirable pharmacologic and physicochemical properties for the discovery of xanthine-based A_{2A} receptor antagonist and the search for alternative non-xanthine-based heterocyclic derivatives has increasingly been the focus of research. The derivatives for non-xanthine-based adenosine A_{2A} receptor antagonists have been classified based on their core structures, as monocyclic, fused bicyclic and fused tricyclic. Currently, several monocyclic core derivatives are being evaluated as potential adenosine A_{2A} receptor antagonists and various fused bicyclic and tricyclic compounds have been identified as such. These antagonists contain an exocyclic amino group and the potency and selectivity have been explored by inserting various substituents onto the heterocyclic templates.

== History ==
In 1929, adenosine was discovered as a naturally occurring nucleoside that can influence physiological functions. This discovery was made by Drury and Szent-Györgyi. In the early 1930s the lability of adenosine was documented and the synthesis of more stable analogues began. Even before the first X-ray structures of the adenosine receptors were clarified, there were previously known various classes of adenosine antagonists.

In 1965, the effects of caffeine on mammalian atrial muscle was documented by De Gubareffand Sleator. Then 5 years later, the effects of adenosine and adenine nucleotides on the cAMP in the guinea pig brain was described by Sattin and Rall.

In 1980, methylxanthines caffeine and theophylline were observed in mice by Fredholm and others. They discovered that those substances stimulated and enhanced locomotor activity by blocking adenosine receptors.
