= MSX-4 =

Selective adenosine A2A receptor antagonist

Clinical data
- Drug class: Adenosine A_{2A} receptor antagonist

Identifiers
- IUPAC name: L-valine-3-{8-[(E)-2-[3-methoxyphenyl)ethenyl]-7-methyl-1-propargylxanthine-3-yl}propyl ester
- CAS Number: 1072907-79-9

Chemical and physical data
- Formula: C_{26}H_{30}N_{5}O_{5}
- Molar mass: 492.556 g·mol^{−1}
- 3D model (JSmol): Interactive image
- SMILES: COC1=CC=CC(/C=C/C2N(C)C3=C(N(CCCOC(=O)[C@](C(C)C)N([H])[H])C(=O)N(CC#C)C3=O)N=2)=C1
- InChI: InChI=1S/C26H30N5O5/c1-6-13-31-24(32)22-23(30(26(31)34)14-8-15-36-25(33)21(27)17(2)3)28-20(29(22)4)12-11-18-9-7-10-19(16-18)35-5/h1,7,9-12,16-17H,8,13-15,27H2,2-5H3/b12-11+; Key:APBGNHUAEAMEBF-VAWYXSNFSA-N

MSX-4 is a selective adenosine A_{2A} receptor antagonist used in scientific research. It is a water-soluble amino acid ester prodrug of MSX-2, the active metabolite of the drug. MSX-4 reverses the motivational deficits induced by the dopamine D_{2} receptor antagonist eticlopride in animals and hence has the capacity to produce pro-motivational effects. MSX-4 was first described in the scientific literature by 2008.

== See also ==
- Istradefylline
- MSX-3
