= Biotie Therapies =

Finnish pharmaceutical company

Biotie Therapies Oyj
- Type: Public
- Traded as: Nasdaq Helsinki: BTH1V; Nasdaq: BITI
- Industry: Biotechnology
- Founded: 1998; 28 years ago
- Headquarters: Turku, Finland
- Key people: Markku Jalkanen (founding CEO); Timo Veromaa (CEO); Peter Fellner (chairman of the board)
- Revenue: ▲€ 4.8 million (2012)
- Operating income: ▲ (€25.6 million) (2012)
- Number of employees: 38 (end 2012)
- Website: www.biotie.com

Biotie Therapies Oyj was a Finnish biotechnology and pharmaceutics company that was acquired by Acorda Therapeutics in January 2016. The company's research and development was focused on drugs for neurodegenerative and psychiatric disorders like Parkinson's disease, Alzheimer's disease and other cognitive disorders, alcohol and drug dependence and post traumatic stress disorder, and inflammatory and fibrotic liver disease. The company's headquarters is in Turku, Western Finland, and it is listed on NASDAQ OMX Helsinki.

== Overview ==
Biotie Therapies was formed in the merger of Biotie Therapies Corp. (incorporated in 1998), Oy Contral Pharma Ltd and Carbion Inc in the year 2002. In 2008, Biotie Therapies acquired the German pharmaceutical discovery and development company Elbion GmbH in Radebeul. In 2010 Biotie Therapies all preclinical assets were transferred into a new company, biocrea GmbH, in which Biotie become a minority shareholder. In 2011, Biotie acquired a pharmaceutical company, Synosia.

The company has partnering agreements with H. Lundbeck A/S and UCB.

In January 2016, Acorda Therapeutics acquired Biotie Therapies for $363 million.

== Product pipeline ==
| Name | Target indications | Partner | Status |
|---|---|---|---|
| Selincro (nalmefene) | alcohol dependence | Lundbeck | EU marketing authorization received |
| Tozadenant SYN115 | Parkinson's disease | UCB | Phase III clinical trials to start 2015 |
| VAP-1 antibody | inflammatory diseases | - | Phase I clinical trials ready, seeking partner |
| SYN120 | AD, cognitive disorders | - | Phase I clinical trials ready, seeking partner |
| Nepicastat SYN117 | PTSD, cocaine dependency | NIDA | PTSD: Phase II clinical trials, results Cocaine dependency: Phase II clinical trials, in progress |
| Ronomilast | COPD | - | Phase I clinical trials ready, seeking partner |
| Nitisinone SYN118 | Movement disorder | UCB | Phase II clinical trials, terminated |

=== Selincro (nalmefene) ===
The company's most advanced product, Nalmefene, for the treatment of alcoholism. Biotie's partner H. Lundbeck A/S received European marketing authorization from the European Commission on 28 February 2013. Lundbeck expects to launch Selincro in its first markets in the middle of 2013.

Studies have shown, that nalmefene has the ability to significantly limit both the patient's average alcohol intake and the number of days with an intake above five units of alcohol. The drug works by removing the patient's desire to drink more, thereby controlling and limiting the intake of alcohol. The drug will be used in tablet form, and taken only according to need. According to the company, this is a novel approach for alcohol dependency treatment; existing treatments are aimed at keeping the patient from drinking and the drugs have to be taken continuously over a longer period of time.

=== Tozadenant ===
SYN115, also called tozadenant, was developed as a potential treatment for Parkinson's disease or other CNS disorders. It was an orally administered, potent and [selective inhibitor of the adenosine A2A receptor.

In January 2016, the company was acquired by Acorda Therapeutics, for US$363 million. In November 2017, the company announced discontinuation of the agent following the death of 5 patients enrolled in the tozadenant Phase III trial from agranulocytosis and associated severe adverse events possibly related to tozadenant.

=== VAP-1 ===
Vascular Adhesion Protein-1 (VAP-1) monoclonal antibody - intended for treatment of inflammatory diseases, is currently in Phase I clinical trials with rheumatoid arthritis patients. According to the company, inhibiting VAP-1 reduces inflammation by regulating the migration of leukocytes, or white blood cells, to inflamed tissues. Pathological accumulation of white blood cells in tissue is a common feature in many autoimmune diseases, such as rheumatoid arthritis, ulcerative colitis, and psoriasis.

=== Nepicastat ===
SYN117 also called nepicastat is a treatment for cocaine dependency and post traumatic stress disorder (PTSD). It is orally administered, potent and selective inhibitor of the enzyme dopamine β-hydroxylase (DBH).

=== Ronomilast ===
Ronomilast is a PDE4 inhibitor for chronic inflammatory disorders. It is a small molecule phosphodiesterase-4 inhibitor (PDE4). The product is developed for the treatment of chronic obstructive pulmonary disease (COPD). Data from pre-clinical and early clinical trials indicates that the product has a good safety profile. Biotie is in the process of planning a Phase 2 trial in COPD patients and also seeking a partner for late-stage development of ronomilast.
