= Vipadenant =

Clinical data
- Other names: BG-14; BG14; BIIB-014; BIIB014; BIIB14; CEB-4520; V-2006; VER-11135; VER-A00-11; VER-A00049; VER-ADO-49; VR-2006
- Routes of administration: Oral
- Drug class: Adenosine A_{2A} receptor antagonist; Antiparkinsonian agent
- ATC code: None

Identifiers
- IUPAC name: 3-[(4-amino-3-methylphenyl)methyl]-7-(furan-2-yl)triazolo[4,5-d]pyrimidin-5-amine
- CAS Number: 442908-10-3
- PubChem CID: 21874557
- IUPHAR/BPS: 5612
- DrugBank: DB06625
- ChemSpider: 10620930
- UNII: LDR3USH1NJ
- KEGG: D09991
- ChEMBL: ChEMBL447664
- PDB ligand: 9XT (PDBe, RCSB PDB)
- CompTox Dashboard (EPA): DTXSID90196103

Chemical and physical data
- Formula: C_{16}H_{15}N_{7}O
- Molar mass: 321.344 g·mol^{−1}
- 3D model (JSmol): Interactive image
- SMILES: CC1=C(C=CC(=C1)CN2C3=NC(=NC(=C3N=N2)C4=CC=CO4)N)N
- InChI: InChI=1S/C16H15N7O/c1-9-7-10(4-5-11(9)17)8-23-15-14(21-22-23)13(19-16(18)20-15)12-3-2-6-24-12/h2-7H,8,17H2,1H3,(H2,18,19,20); Key:HQSBCDPYXDGTCL-UHFFFAOYSA-N

Vipadenant (INN, USAN; developmental code name BIIB014 and others) is an adenosine A_{2A} receptor antagonist which was under development for the treatment of Parkinson's disease and cancer but was never marketed. It is taken orally. The drug was first described in the scientific literature by 2006. It was under development by Vernalis, Biogen, and Juno Therapeutics. Vipadenant reached phase 2 clinical trials prior to the discontinuation of its development.

== See also ==
- Adenosine receptor antagonist
- List of investigational Parkinson's disease drugs
