= PSB-10 =

Chemical compound

Clinical data
- Other names: PSB-10

Identifiers
- IUPAC name: (8R)-ethyl-4-methyl-2-(2,3,5-trichlorophenyl)-4,5,7,8-tetrahydro-1H-imidazo[2,1-i]purin-5-one
- CAS Number: 439902-54-2; HCl: 591771-91-4
- PubChem CID: 10318703
- IUPHAR/BPS: 5619
- ChemSpider: 8494167
- UNII: 2DRZ23E4F7; HCl: C2R36CZP9N
- ChEMBL: ChEMBL1562432

Chemical and physical data
- Formula: C_{16}H_{14}Cl_{3}N_{5}O
- Molar mass: 398.67 g·mol^{−1}
- 3D model (JSmol): Interactive image
- SMILES: Clc2cc(Cl)cc(c2Cl)C(=N3)NC1C3N(C)C(=O)N4C1=NC(C4)CC
- InChI: InChI=1S/C16H14Cl3N5O/c1-3-8-6-24-15(20-8)12-14(23(2)16(24)25)22-13(21-12)9-4-7(17)5-10(18)11(9)19/h4-5,8H,3,6H2,1-2H3,(H,21,22)/t8-/m1/s1; Key:YYDHUJWLNPIBDS-MRVPVSSYSA-N

PSB-10 is a drug which acts as a selective antagonist for the adenosine A_{3} receptor (k_{i} value at human A_{3} receptor is 0.44 nM), with high selectivity over the other three adenosine receptor subtypes (k_{i} values at human A_{1}, A_{2A} and A_{2B} receptors are 4.1, 3.3 and 30 μM). Further pharmacological experiments in a [^{35}S]GTPγS binding assay using hA_{3}-CHO-cells indicated that PSB-10 acts as an inverse agonist (IC_{50} = 4 nM). It has been shown to produce antiinflammatory effects in animal studies. Simple xanthine derivatives such as caffeine and DPCPX have generally low affinity for the A_{3} subtype and must be extended by expanding the ring system and adding an aromatic group to give high A_{3} affinity and selectivity. The affinity towards adenosine A_{3} subtype was measured against the radioligand PSB-11.
