= Rapiscan =

Rapiscan may refer to:

- Rapiscan, a brand for the pharmaceutical drug regadenoson
- Rapiscan Systems, a manufacturer of metal detectors
