= KF-26777 =

Chemical compound

Clinical data
- Other names: KF-26777

Identifiers
- IUPAC name: (2-(4-bromophenyl)-7,8-dihydro-4-propyl-1H-imidazo[2,1-i]purin-5(4H)-one
- CAS Number: 206129-88-6
- PubChem CID: 9820916
- ChemSpider: 7996665
- UNII: N33070GI64
- ChEMBL: ChEMBL2181965
- CompTox Dashboard (EPA): DTXSID101028432

Chemical and physical data
- Formula: C_{16}H_{18}BrN_{5}O
- Molar mass: 376.258 g·mol^{−1}
- 3D model (JSmol): Interactive image
- SMILES: CCCN(C2=O)C1N=C(c(cc3)ccc3Br)NC1C=4N2CCN=4
- InChI: InChI=1S/C16H16BrN5O/c1-2-8-21-15-12(14-18-7-9-22(14)16(21)23)19-13(20-15)10-3-5-11(17)6-4-10/h3-6H,2,7-9H2,1H3,(H,19,20); Key:GYGNZJDWTHECQT-UHFFFAOYSA-N

KF-26777 is a drug which acts as a potent and selective antagonist for the adenosine A_{3} receptor, with sub-nanomolar affinity (A_{3} Ki=0.2nM) and high selectivity over the other three adenosine receptor subtypes. Simple xanthine derivatives such as caffeine and DPCPX have generally low affinity for the A_{3} subtype and must be extended by expanding the ring system and adding an aromatic group to give high A_{3} affinity and selectivity.
