= SCH-58261 =

Chemical compound

Clinical data
- ATC code: none

Legal status
- Legal status: In general: uncontrolled

Identifiers
- IUPAC name: 5-Amino-7-(2-phenylethyl)-2-(2-furyl)-pyrazolo(4,3-e)-1,2,4-triazolo(1,5-c)pyrimidine
- CAS Number: 160098-96-4
- PubChem CID: 176408
- IUPHAR/BPS: 403
- ChemSpider: 153647
- UNII: 4309023MAH
- ChEMBL: ChEMBL17127
- CompTox Dashboard (EPA): DTXSID80166799

Chemical and physical data
- Formula: C_{18}H_{15}N_{7}O
- Molar mass: 345.366 g·mol^{−1}
- 3D model (JSmol): Interactive image
- SMILES: c1ccccc1CCN1N=CC2=C1N=C(N)N3C2=NC(C4=CC=CO4)=N3
- InChI: InChI=1S/C18H15N7O/c19-18-22-16-13(11-20-24(16)9-8-12-5-2-1-3-6-12)17-21-15(23-25(17)18)14-7-4-10-26-14/h1-7,10-11H,8-9H2,(H2,19,22); Key:UTLPKQYUXOEJIL-UHFFFAOYSA-N

SCH-58261 is a drug which acts as a potent and selective antagonist for the adenosine receptor A_{2A}, with more than 50x selectivity for A_{2A} over other adenosine receptors. It has been used to investigate the mechanism of action of caffeine, which is a mixed A_{1} / A_{2A} antagonist, and has shown that the A_{2A} receptor is primarily responsible for the stimulant and ergogenic effects of caffeine, but blockade of both A_{1} and A_{2A} receptors is required to accurately replicate caffeine's effects in animals. SCH-58261 has also shown antidepressant, nootropic and neuroprotective effects in a variety of animal models, and has been investigated as a possible treatment for Parkinson's disease.

== See also ==
- CGS-15943
- Istradefylline (KW-6002)
