= CGS-15943 =

Chemical compound

Clinical data
- ATC code: none

Legal status
- Legal status: In general: uncontrolled

Identifiers
- IUPAC name: 9-chloro-2-(furan-2-yl)-[1,2,4]triazolo[1,5-c]quinazolin-5-amine
- CAS Number: 104615-18-1
- PubChem CID: 2690
- IUPHAR/BPS: 384
- ChemSpider: 2589
- UNII: Y5A5D5E2AQ
- ChEBI: CHEBI:131351
- ChEMBL: ChEMBL16687
- CompTox Dashboard (EPA): DTXSID80146617

Chemical and physical data
- Formula: C_{13}H_{8}ClN_{5}O
- Molar mass: 285.69 g·mol^{−1}
- 3D model (JSmol): Interactive image
- SMILES: ClC1=CC=C2N=C(N)N3N=C(C4=CC=CO4)N=C3C2=C1
- InChI: InChI=1S/C13H8ClN5O/c14-7-3-4-9-8(6-7)12-17-11(10-2-1-5-20-10)18-19(12)13(15)16-9/h1-6H,(H2,15,16); Key:MSJODEOZODDVGW-UHFFFAOYSA-N

CGS-15943 is a drug which acts as a potent and reasonably selective antagonist for the adenosine receptors A_{1} and A_{2A}, having a K_{i} of 3.3nM at A_{2A} and 21nM at A_{1}. It was one of the first adenosine receptor antagonists discovered that is not a xanthine derivative, instead being a triazoloquinazoline. Consequently, CGS-15943 has the advantage over most xanthine derivatives that it is not a phosphodiesterase inhibitor, and so has more a specific pharmacological effects profile. It produces similar effects to caffeine in animal studies, though with higher potency.

== See also ==
- ATL-444
- SCH-58261
