= Acorda Therapeutics =

American biotechnology company

Acorda Therapeutics, Inc.
- Type: Public
- Industry: Health care; Biotechnology
- Founded: 1995; 31 years ago
- Founder: Ron Cohen
- Headquarters: 420 Saw Mill River Road, Ardsley, New York, United States
- Key people: Ron Cohen (CEO)
- Products: Ampyra; Inbrija
- Revenue: ▼US$192.408 million (2019)
- Operating income: ▲US$−311.632 million (2019)
- Net income: ▲US$−272.966 million (2019)
- Total assets: ▼US$799.718 million (2019)
- Total equity: ▼US$310.820 million (2019)
- Number of employees: 344 (2020)
- Website: acorda.com

Acorda Therapeutics, Inc. is an American biotechnology company based in Pearl River, New York. The company develops therapies that improve neurological function in people with Parkinson's disease, multiple sclerosis and other neurological disorders. Acorda Therapeutics manufactures and markets the drugs Inbrija (levodopa inhalation powder) and Ampyra (dalfampridine) in the United States.

== Products ==
- Ampyra (dalfampridine)
- Inbrija (levodopa inhalation powder)

Inbrija is administered by inhalation and is indicated for the intermittent treatment of off episodes in patients with Parkinson's disease currently taking carbidopa/levodopa. Inbrija is approved by the FDA and the EU.

=== Development pipeline ===
- BTT1023 (timolumab) for primary sclerosing cholangitis (phase II)
- CVT-427 (zolmitriptan) for the acute treatment of migraine (phase I)
- rHIgM22, a remyelinating antibody for the treatment of multiple sclerosis (phase I)

=== ARCUS Technology ===
In September 2014, the company acquired Civitas Therapeutics for US$525 million, gaining the Phase III Parkinson's drug, CVT-301, the migraine drug CVT-427 and rights to the ARCUS pulmonary delivery system. Th ARCUS technology allows for the administration of drugs by inhalation. The FDA-approved drug Inbrija (levodopa inhalation powder) and the clinical-stage drug CVT-427 (zolmitriptan) currently use the ARCUS technology for drug delivery.

== History and business model ==
Acorda Therapeutics was incorporated in 1995, founded by internist turned entrepreneur Ron Cohen in Hawthorne, New York. Cohen had previously worked at the tissue engineering firm Advanced Tissue Sciences from 1986 to 1992. Cohen's focus on neurology at Acorda was influenced by his father's being a neurologist at Columbia University Medical Center. The business model of the company from the start was to work on commercialization of academic discoveries. A single therapeutic area focus also has the advantage that physicians prescribing one drug might also prescribe another in Acorda's portfolio; for instance, the company planned to leverage physician access through tizanidine capsule sales to promote dalfampridine sales.

An initial public offering (IPO) in 2006 raised US$31.5 million, about half of what was expected going into the offering, which was attributed to general weakness of the IPO market at the time. These funds were supplemented by a private sale of shares later the same year, raising and additional US$29.8 million.

As of 2007, twelve years after incorporation, the company had not yet turned a profit.

From 2019 to 2021 the company's earnings per share (EPS) increased by 4.5% every year. In 2021, the company's revenue was down by 13 percent.

In 2024, the company declared Chapter 11 bankruptcy protection, and announced that it had secured a "stalking horse" bid for all of its assets. As a result of the bankruptcy filing, the company's stock fell approximately 40%.

=== Dalfampridine ===
The Canadian Spinal Research Organization held the patent for this drug in 2002 when the organization engaged Acorda to conduct a Phase III trial for treatment of spasticity in patients with chronic spinal cord injury. This was Acorda's flagship product and development of subsequent drug candidates was initially predicated on realized revenue from this drug's sales. In November 2016, the company announced it was discontinuing development of the drug for post-stroke walking difficulties, after a clinical trial failure. In the third quarter of 2019, the company's shares dropped by a significant 65.1% as a result of dalfampridine's multiple sclerosis indication facing competition in the United States.

=== Inbrija ===
In December 2018, the company announced the FDA approval of Inbrija (levodopa inhalation powder) for patients with Parkinson's disease. In January 2021, Acorda sold its manufacturing operations for Inbrija to Catalent for $70 million to reduce the company's operating expenses.

=== Tizanidine ===
The company licensed tizanidine (Zanaflex) from Élan in the early 2000s to help meeting cash flow goals. Acorda sells both capsule and tablet forms of this drug, with emphasis on the capsule form as this has patent protection through 2021, while the tablet form has many generic competitors.

=== Tozadenant ===
In January 2016, the company acquired Finnish pharmaceutical company, Biotie Therapies, for US$363 million. This gave the company control over Biote's primary sclerosing cholangitis drug, BTT1023 and the oral adenosine A2A receptor antagonist tozadenant. In November 2017, the company announced discontinuation of research and development of the Phase III Parkinson's disease drug tozadenant. This followed the death of 5 patients enrolled in the tozadenant Phase III trial from agranulocytosis and associated severe adverse events possibly related to tozadenant.

== Corporate governance ==
As of February 14, 2019, the members of the board of directors of Acorda Therapeutics were: Ron Cohen, Barry Greene, Peder K. Jensen, John P. Kelley, Sandra Panem, Lorin J. Randall, Steven M. Rauscher, and Catherine D. Strader.

As of February 14, 2019, the members of the senior management team were: Ron Cohen M.D. (Founder, president and chief executive officer), Burkhard Blank (chief medical officer), Andrew R. Blight (chief scientific officer emeritus), Denise Duca (executive vice president, human resources), Andrew A. Hidman (chief business officer), David Lawrence (chief, business operations and principal accounting officer), Lauren Sabella (chief commercial officer), Tierney Saccavino (executive vice president, corporate communications) and Jane Wasman (president, international and general counsel).

As of 2019, founder, president and CEO Cohen would be about 63 years old. Andrew Blight was the CSO in 2007 and would, as of 2019, be about 68 years old, an emeritus in this role. As of 2007, David Lawrence was the chief financial officer and Mary Fisher the chief operating officer. Jane Wasman, about 62 in 2019, has held the general counsel role at the company since at least 2007.

In 2024, Acorda Therapeutics went bankrupt with its stock being delisted from the NASDAQ. In its bankruptcy proceedings, a stalking horse offer from Merz Pharma subsidiary Merz Therapeutics was arranged. The deal included Merz's purchase of Inbrija and Ampyra for $185 million.
