= C17H19N5O =

The molecular formula C_{17}H_{19}N_{5}O (molar mass: 309.36 g/mol, exact mass: 309.1590 u) may refer to:

- ATL-444
- Bazinaprine (SR-95,191)
