= LUF6000 =

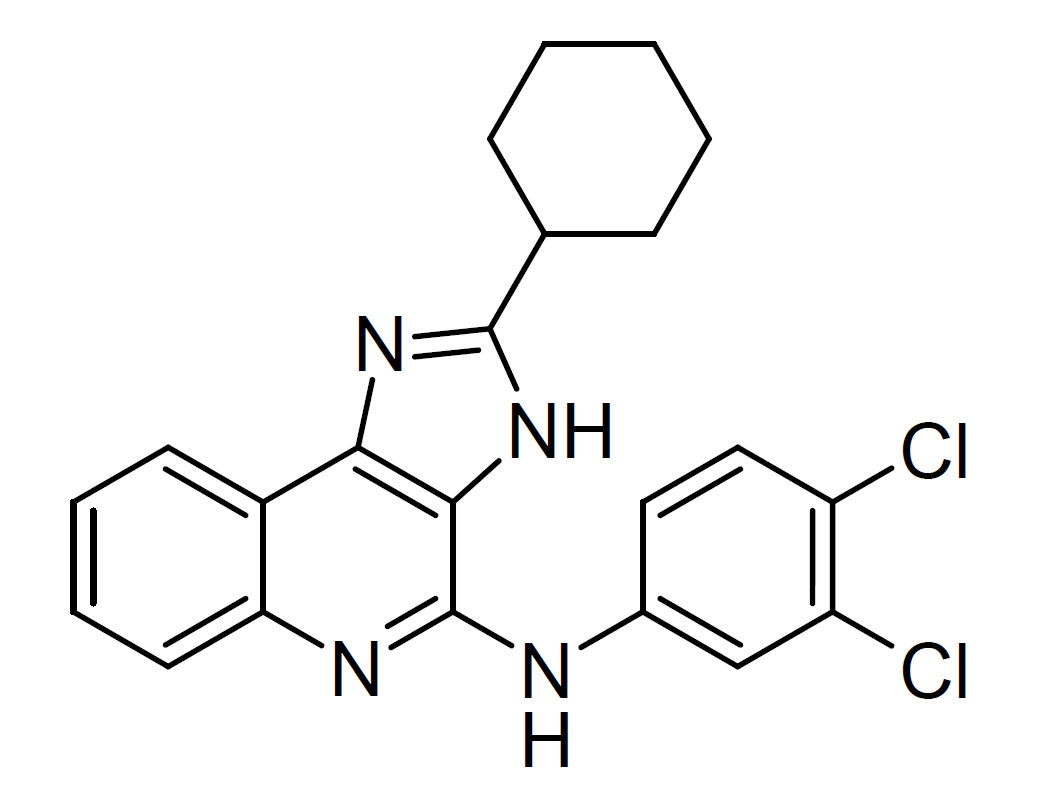

Identifiers
- IUPAC name: 2-cyclohexyl-N-(3,4-dichlorophenyl)-3H-imidazo[4,5-c]quinolin-4-amine
- CAS Number: 890087-21-5
- PubChem CID: 11711282
- IUPHAR/BPS: 9446
- ChemSpider: 9886004
- UNII: B873NP3CAU
- ChEMBL: ChEMBL475346
- CompTox Dashboard (EPA): DTXSID30470994

Chemical and physical data
- Formula: C_{22}H_{20}Cl_{2}N_{4}
- Molar mass: 411.33 g·mol^{−1}
- 3D model (JSmol): Interactive image
- SMILES: C1CCC(CC1)C2=NC3=C(N2)C(=NC4=CC=CC=C43)NC5=CC(=C(C=C5)Cl)Cl
- InChI: InChI=1S/C22H20Cl2N4/c23-16-11-10-14(12-17(16)24)25-22-20-19(15-8-4-5-9-18(15)26-22)27-21(28-20)13-6-2-1-3-7-13/h4-5,8-13H,1-3,6-7H2,(H,25,26)(H,27,28); Key:UWJVRSIGHHSDSJ-UHFFFAOYSA-N

LUF6000 is an experimental drug which acts as a positive allosteric modulator of the adenosine A3 receptor. It has no effect on A3-mediated signalling by itself, but significantly enhances the effect of A3-selective agonists or partial agonists, and can even cause some adenosine A3 antagonists to produce agonist-like signalling. It has antiinflammatory effects in animal studies.
