= ISAM-140 =

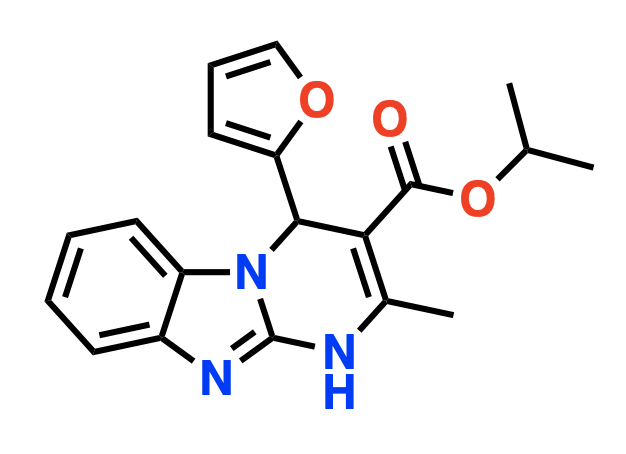

Names
- IUPAC names (±)-Isopropyl 4-(Furan-2-yl)-2-methyl-1,4-dihydrobenzo-[4,5]imidazo[1,2-a]pyrimidine-3-carboxylate, 4-(2-Furanyl)-4,10-dihydro-2-methyl-pyrimido[1,2-a]benzimidazole-3-carboxylic acid 1-methylethyl ester
- Other names ISAM140

Identifiers
CAS Number	932191-62-3
3D model (JSmol)	Interactive image
ChEMBL	ChEMBL3787197
ChemSpider	12904393
IUPHAR/BPS	11223
PubChem CID	17198004
- InChI: InChI=1S/C19H19N3O3/c1-11(2)25-18(23)16-12(3)20-19-21-13-7-4-5-8-14(13)22(19)17(16)15-9-6-10-24-15/h4-11,17H,1-3H3,(H,20,21) Key: NYHLRBMDXQBOIB-UHFFFAOYSA-N
- SMILES: CC1=C(C(N2C3=CC=CC=C3N=C2N1)C4=CC=CO4)C(=O)OC(C)C

Properties
Chemical formula	C_{19}H_{19}N_{3}O_{3}
Molar mass	337.37
Appearance	White solid
- Except where otherwise noted, data are given for materials in their standard state (at 25 °C [77 °F], 100 kPa). verify (what is ?) Infobox references

ISAM-140 is a selective non-xanthinic adenosine A_{2B} receptor antagonist. Discovered in 2016, it has a K_{i} of 3.49 nM on the A_{2B} receptor and >1000-fold selectivity with respect to the other three adenosine receptor subtypes. It has been shown to help the immune system to attack cancer cells in in vitro assays by rescuing T and NK cell proliferation, cytokine release, and TIL infiltration.
