= Adenosine receptor =

Class of four receptor proteins to the molecule adenosine

The adenosine receptors (or P1 receptors) are a class of purinergic G protein-coupled receptors with adenosine as the endogenous ligand. There are four known types of adenosine receptors in humans: A_{1}, A_{2A}, A_{2B} and A_{3}; each is encoded by a different gene.

The adenosine receptors are commonly known for their antagonists caffeine, theophylline, and theobromine, whose action on the receptors produces the stimulating effects of coffee, tea and chocolate.

== Pharmacology ==
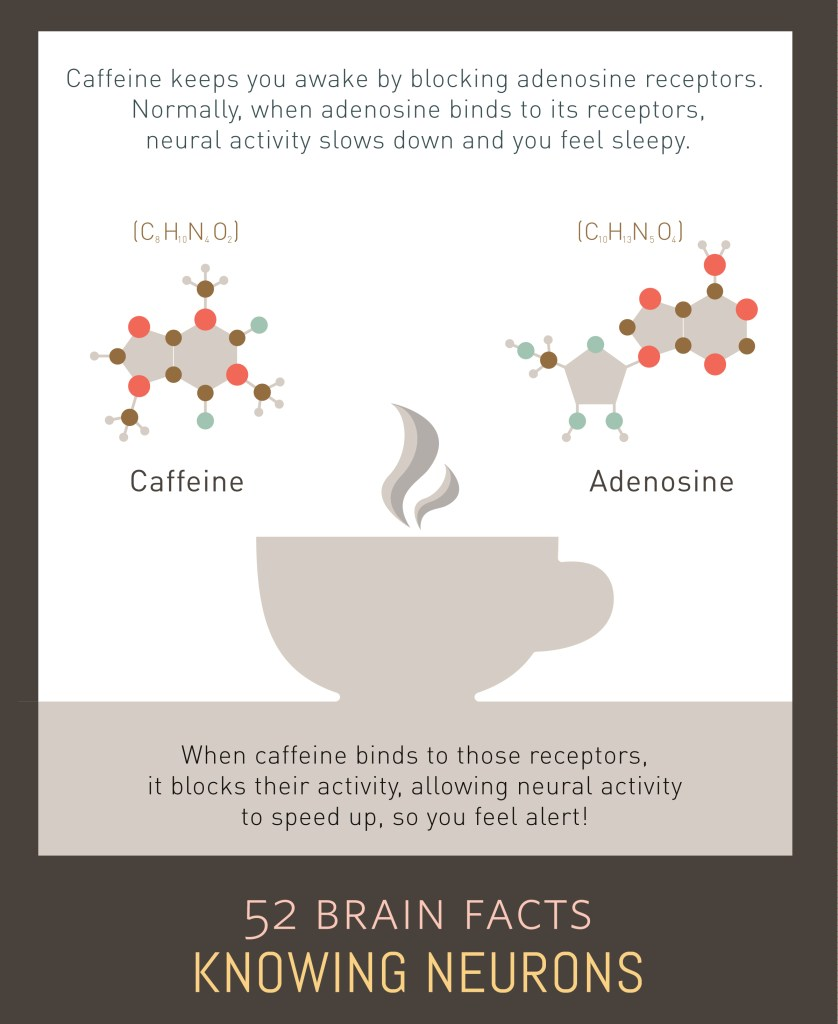
Caffeine keeps you awake by blocking adenosine receptors.

Each type of adenosine receptor has different functions, although with some overlap. For instance, both A_{1} receptors and A_{2A} play roles in the heart, regulating myocardial oxygen consumption and coronary blood flow, while the A_{2A} receptor also has broader anti-inflammatory effects throughout the body. These two receptors also have important roles in the brain, regulating the release of other neurotransmitters such as dopamine and glutamate, while the A_{2B} and A_{3} receptors are located mainly peripherally and are involved in processes such as inflammation and immune responses.

Most older compounds acting on adenosine receptors are nonselective, with the endogenous agonist adenosine being used in hospitals as treatment for severe tachycardia (rapid heart beat), and acting directly to slow the heart through action on all four adenosine receptors in heart tissue, as well as producing a sedative effect through action on A_{1} and A_{2A} receptors in the brain. Xanthine derivatives such as caffeine and theophylline act as non-selective antagonists at A_{1} and A_{2A} receptors in both heart and brain and so have the opposite effect to adenosine, producing a stimulant effect and rapid heart rate. These compounds also act as phosphodiesterase inhibitors, which produces additional anti-inflammatory effects, and makes them medically useful for the treatment of conditions such as asthma, but less suitable for use in scientific research.

Newer adenosine receptor agonists and antagonists are much more potent and subtype-selective, and have allowed extensive research into the effects of blocking or stimulating the individual adenosine receptor subtypes, which is now resulting in a new generation of more selective drugs with many potential medical uses. Some of these compounds are still derived from adenosine or from the xanthine family, but researchers in this area have also discovered many selective adenosine receptor ligands that are entirely structurally distinct, giving a wide range of possible directions for future research.

== Subtypes ==
=== Comparison ===
Adenosine receptors
Receptor	Gene	Mechanism	Effects	Agonists	Antagonists
A_{1}	ADORA1	G_{i/o} → cAMP↑/↓: Inhibition; ↓ vesicle release; Bronchoconstriction; Afferent arteriolar constriction in Kidney	Decreased heart rate	N6-Cyclopentyladenosine; N6-3-methoxyl-4-hydroxybenzyl adenine riboside (B2); Adenosine; CCPA; Certain Benzodiazepines and Barbiturates; 2'-MeCCPA; GR 79236; SDZ WAG 994; Benzyloxy-cyclopentyladenosine (BnOCPA)	Caffeine; Theophylline; 8-Cyclopentyl-1,3-dimethylxanthine (CPX); 8-Cyclopentyl-1,3-dipropylxanthine (DPCPX); 8-Phenyl-1,3-dipropylxanthine; PSB 36
A_{2A}	ADORA2A	G_{s} → cAMP↑	Coronary artery vasodilatation; Decreased dopaminergic activity in CNS; Inhibition of central neuron excitation.	N6-3-methoxyl-4-hydroxybenzyl adenine riboside (B2); ATL-146e; CGS-21680; Regadenoson; Adenosine	Caffeine; Aminophylline; Theophylline; Istradefylline; SCH-58261; SCH-442,416; ZM-241,385
A_{2B}	ADORA2B	G_{s} → cAMP↑ Also recently discovered A_{2B} has Gq → DAG and IP3 → Release calcium → activate calmodulin → activate myosin light chain kinase → phosphorylate myosin light chain → myosin light chain plus actin → bronchoconstriction	Bronchospasm	5'-N-ethylcarboxamidoadenosine; BAY 60–6583; Adenosine; LUF-5835; LUF-5845	Theophylline; Caffeine; CVT-6883; MRS-1706; MRS-1754; PSB-603; PSB-0788; PSB-1115
A_{3}	ADORA3	G_{i/o} → ↓cAMP	Cardiac muscle relaxation; Smooth muscle contraction; Cardioprotective in cardiac ischemia; Inhibition of neutrophil degranulation	2-(1-Hexynyl)-N-methyladenosine; CF-101 (IB-MECA); Adenosine; 2-Cl-IB-MECA; CP-532,903; MRS-3558	Theophylline; Caffeine; MRS-1191; MRS-1220; MRS-1334; MRS-1523; MRS-3777; MRE3008F20; PSB-10; PSB-11; VUF-5574

=== A_{1} adenosine receptor ===
The adenosine A_{1} receptor has been found to be ubiquitous throughout the entire body.

==== Mechanism ====
This receptor has an inhibitory function on most of the tissues in which it is expressed. In the brain, it slows metabolic activity by a combination of actions. Presynaptically, it reduces synaptic vesicle release while post synaptically it has been found to stabilize the magnesium on the NMDA receptor^{source?}.

==== Antagonism and agonism ====
Specific A_{1} antagonists include 8-cyclopentyl-1,3-dipropyl xanthine (DPCPX), and cyclopentyltheophylline (CPT) or 8-cyclopentyl-1,3-dipropylxanthine (CPX), while specific agonists include 2-chloro-N(6)-cyclopentyladenosine (CCPA).

Tecadenoson is an effective A_{1} adenosine agonist, as is selodenoson.

==== In the heart ====
The A_{1}, together with A_{2A} receptors of endogenous adenosine play a role in regulating myocardial oxygen consumption and coronary blood flow. Stimulation of the A_{1} receptor has a myocardial depressant effect by decreasing the conduction of electrical impulses and suppressing pacemaker cell function, resulting in a decrease in heart rate. This makes adenosine a useful medication for treating and diagnosing tachyarrhythmias, or excessively fast heart rates. This effect on the A_{1} receptor also explains why there is a brief moment of cardiac standstill when adenosine is administered as a rapid IV push during cardiac resuscitation. The rapid infusion causes a momentary myocardial stunning effect.

In normal physiological states, this serves as a protective mechanism. However, in altered cardiac function, such as hypoperfusion caused by hypotension, heart attack or cardiac arrest caused by nonperfusing bradycardias (e.g., ventricular fibrillation or pulseless ventricular tachycardia), adenosine has a negative effect on physiological functioning by preventing necessary compensatory increases in heart rate and blood pressure that attempt to maintain cerebral perfusion.

==== In neonatal medicine ====
Adenosine antagonists are widely used in neonatal medicine;

A reduction in A_{1} expression appears to prevent hypoxia-induced ventriculomegaly and loss of white matter, which raises the possibility that pharmacological blockade of A_{1} may have clinical utility.

Theophylline and caffeine are nonselective adenosine antagonists that are used to stimulate respiration in premature infants.

==== Bone homeostasis ====
Adenosine receptors play a key role in the homeostasis of bone. The A_{1} receptor has been shown to stimulate osteoclast differentiation and function. Studies have found that blockade of the A_{1} Receptor suppresses the osteoclast function, leading to increased bone density.

=== A_{2A} adenosine receptor ===
As with the A_{1}, the A_{2A} receptors are believed to play a role in regulating myocardial oxygen consumption and coronary blood flow.

==== Mechanism ====
The activity of A_{2A} adenosine receptor, a G-protein coupled receptor family member, is mediated by G proteins that activate adenylyl cyclase. It is abundant in basal ganglia, vasculature and platelets and it is a major target of caffeine.

==== Function ====
The A_{2A} receptor is responsible for regulating myocardial blood flow by vasodilating the coronary arteries, which increases blood flow to the myocardium, but may lead to hypotension. Just as in A1 receptors, this normally serves as a protective mechanism, but may be destructive in altered cardiac function.

==== Agonists and antagonists ====
Specific antagonists include istradefylline (KW-6002) and SCH-58261, while specific agonists include CGS-21680 and ATL-146e.

==== Bone homeostasis ====
The role of A2A receptor opposes that of A1 in that it inhibits osteoclast differentiation and activates osteoblasts. Studies have shown it to be effective in decreasing inflammatory osteolysis in inflamed bone. This role could potentiate new therapeutic treatment in aid of bone regeneration and increasing bone volume.

=== A_{2B} adenosine receptor ===
This integral membrane protein stimulates adenylate cyclase activity in the presence of adenosine. This protein also interacts with netrin-1, which is involved in axon elongation.

==== In the brain ====
In the brain, A2B receptor activation by adenosine released in response to increased neuronal activity engages the cAMP–PKA signalling pathway in astrocytes, stimulating glucose metabolism in these glial cells to support neuronal energy needs.

==== Bone homeostasis ====
Similarly to A2A receptor, the A2B receptor promotes osteoblast differentiation. The osteoblast cell is derived from the Mesenchymal Stem Cell (MSC) which can also differentiate into a chondrocyte. The cell signalling involved in the stimulation of the A2B receptor directs the route of differentiation to osteoblast, rather than chondrocyte via the Runx2 gene expression. Potential therapeutic application in aiding bone degenerative diseases, age related changes as well as injury repair.

=== A_{3} adenosine receptor ===
It has been shown in studies to inhibit some specific signal pathways of adenosine. It allows for the inhibition of growth in human melanoma cells. Specific antagonists include MRS1191, MRS1523 and MRE3008F20, while specific agonists include Cl-IB-MECA and MRS3558.

==== Bone homeostasis ====
The role of A3 receptor is less defined in this field. Studies have shown that it plays a role in the downregulation of osteoclasts. Its function in regards to osteoblasts remains ambiguous.

== Ligand affinities ==
=== Adenosine receptor agonists ===
Binding affinities (K_{i}, nM) of notable adenosine receptor agonists
Compound	A_{1}	A_{2A}	A_{2B}	A_{3}	Selectivity
Adenosine	~100 (h); 73 (r)	310 (h); 150 (r)	15,000 (h); 5100 (r)	290 (h); 6500 (r)	Non-selective
2-Chloroadenosine	6.7 (r)	76 (r)	24,000 (h)	1890 (r)	A_{1}-selective
CV-1808	400 (r)	100 (r)	ND	ND	ND
NECA	14 (h); 5.1 (r)	20 (h); 9.7 (r)	140 (h); 1890 (h); 1900 (m)	25 (h); 113 (r)	Non-selective
CGS-21680	289 (h); 1800 (r); 120 (rb)	27 (h); 19 (r)	>10,000 (h) >10,000 (r)	67 (h); 584 (r); 673 (rb)	A_{2A}-selective
HENECA	60 (h)	6.4 (h)	6100	2.4 (h)	Non-selective
BAY 60-6583	>10,000 (h)	>10,000 (h)	3–10 (h); 330 (m); 750 (d); 340 (rb)	>10,000 (h)	A_{2B}-selective
Notes: Values are in nanomolar (nM) units. The smaller the value, the more avidly the compound binds to the site. The parentheses after values indicate the species: h = human, r = rat, m = mouse, rb = rabbit, d = dog.

=== Adenosine receptor antagonists ===
Binding affinities (K_{i}, nM) of notable adenosine receptor antagonists
Compound	A_{1}	A_{2A}	A_{2B}	A_{3}	Selectivity
Caffeine	10,700 (h); 44,900 (h); 41,000 (r); 44,000 (r); 47,000 (gp); 44,000 (c)	23,400 (h); 9560 (h); 45,000 (r); 32,500 (r); 48,000 (r)	33,800 (h); 10,400 (h); 20,500 (h); 30,000 (r); 13,000 (m)	13,300 (h) >100,000 (r)	Non-selective
Theophylline	6770 (h); 14,000 (r); 8740 (r); 7060 (gp); 4710 (rb); 9050 (s); 6330 (c)	1710 (h); 6700 (h); 22,000 (r); 25300 (r)	9070 (h); 74,000 (h); 15,100 (r); 5630 (m); 11,000 (gp); 17,700 (rb); 38,700 (d)	22,300 (h); 86,400 (h) >100,000 (r); 85,000 (r) >100,000 (d)	Non-selective
Theobromine	105,000 (r); 83,400 (r)	>250,000 (r); 187,000 (r)	130,000 (h)	>100,000 (r)	Non-selective
Paraxanthine	21,000 (r)	32,000 (r)	4,500 (h)	>100,000 (r)	Non-selective
3-Chlorostyrylcaffeine (CSC)	28,000 (r)	54 (r)	8200	>10,000 (r)	A_{2A}-selective
MSX-2	900 (r); 2500 (h)	8.04 (r); 5.38 (h); 14.5 (h)	>10,000 (h)	>10,000 (h)	A_{2A}-selective
Istradefylline (KW-6002)	841 (h); 230 (r)	12 (h); 91.2 (h); 2.2 (r); 4.46 (r)	>10,000 (h)	4470 (h)	A_{2A}-selective
CGS-15943	3.5 (h)	1.2 (h)	32.4 (h)	35 (h)	Non-selective
SCH-58261	725 (h)	5.0 (h)	1110 (h)	1200 (h)	A_{2A}-selective
ZM-241385	255	0.8	50	>10,000	A_{2A}-selective
Preladenant (SCH-420814)	>1000 (h)	0.9 (h)	>1000 (h)	>1000 (h)	A_{2A}-selective
Notes: Values are in nanomolar (nM) units. The smaller the value, the more avidly the compound binds to the site. The parentheses after values indicate the species: h = human, r = rat, m = mouse, gp = guinea pig, rb = rabbit, c = calf or cow, s = sheep.
