= Lu AA47070 =

Adenosine A2A receptor antagonist for Parkinson's disease

Clinical data
- Other names: Lu-AA47070; LU AA 47070; LU-AA-47070
- Drug class: Adenosine A_{2A} receptor antagonist

Identifiers
- IUPAC name: [2-[4-(3,3-dimethylbutanoylamino)-3,5-difluorobenzoyl]imino-1,3-thiazol-3-yl]methyl dihydrogen phosphate
- CAS Number: 913842-25-8
- PubChem CID: 11947802
- ChemSpider: 62804024
- UNII: S4AD6SAU9U
- ChEMBL: ChEMBL1671940

Chemical and physical data
- Formula: C_{17}H_{20}F_{2}N_{3}O_{6}PS
- Molar mass: 463.39 g·mol^{−1}
- 3D model (JSmol): Interactive image
- SMILES: CC(C)(C)CC(=O)NC1=C(C=C(C=C1F)C(=O)N=C2N(C=CS2)COP(=O)(O)O)F
- InChI: InChI=1S/C17H20F2N3O6PS/c1-17(2,3)8-13(23)20-14-11(18)6-10(7-12(14)19)15(24)21-16-22(4-5-30-16)9-28-29(25,26)27/h4-7H,8-9H2,1-3H3,(H,20,23)(H2,25,26,27); Key:MSWIQSFUBYCFJE-UHFFFAOYSA-N

Lu AA47070 is a selective adenosine A_{2A} receptor antagonist that was under development for the treatment of Parkinson's disease but was never marketed. It has been found to reverse some of the effects of dopamine D_{2} receptor antagonists like pimozide and haloperidol, for instance tremulous jaw movements, catalepsy, locomotor suppression, and other anti-motivational effects, in animals. The drug is a prodrug of Lu AA41063. It was discontinued in phase 1 clinical trials because it lacked the intended pharmacological properties in humans. Lu AA47070 was first described by 2008.
