= Canadian Spinal Research Organization =

Canadian charity

- Abbreviation: CSRO
- Type: Non-profit organizations based in Canada
- Legal status: Active
- Purpose: Finding a cure for paralysis, research, support
- Headquarters: Toronto, Ontario, Canada
- Region served: Canada
- Official language: English
- Affiliations: Shoot For A Cure, Play It Cool
- Website: www.csro.com

The Canadian Spinal Research Organization (SCRO) is a nationally registered charity whose mission is to improve the physical quality of life for persons with spinal cord injuries (SCI) and related neurological deficits, as well as to reduce the number of spinal cord injuries through awareness and prevention programs.

== History ==
In 1982, Ray Wickson was involved in an accident leaving him paralyzed. While recovering at the Lyndhurst Rehabilitation Centre, in Toronto, Ontario, Wickson began to inquire about the possibility of finding a cure for paralysis. He learned from the US-based Spinal Cord Society (SCS) that there had been little research conducted on spinal cord injuries since 1945. In 1983, Wickson joined SCS and was asked to form a Canadian office, of which he did so shortly thereafter.

SCSC (Spinal Cord Society Canada) became a branch office for SCS U.S.A, founded by Dr. Charles Carson. Ray Wickson became the Canadian head of this international organization dedicated to "cure research", which focused on finding a cure for chronic spinal cord injuries. In the mid-1980s there were two main chapters in existence that were raising funds for research in Ontario, one in Mississauga, Ontario, headed by Jocelyn Lovell, the other in Barrie headed by Antony Gariepy.

In 1987, Ray Wickson was asked to resign from SCS due to a crisis of leadership, and shortly after this, he quit, leaving him free to create an identical organization in Canada called CSRO. The Canadian Spinal Research Organization was originally a concept from SCS U.S.A. founder, Dr. Charles Carson who observed the long-held hopeless dogma promulgated by the medical establishment in respect to finding a cure for spinal cord injuries, and the need to challenge the status quo.

After his resignation in 1987, Wickson connected with Barry Munro, who was a patient in rehab at Lyndhurst Hospital at the time, after he sustained a spinal cord injury from a diving accident. Wickson started the CSRO on February 14, 1984, under the name Spinal Cord Society of Canada. At that time, no other chapters followed him into this new venture other than his newest recruit Barry Munro.

Wickson uses the rational and structure of SCS U.S.A., as the basis for CSRO, which originated by Dr. Charles Carson of Fergus Falls, Minnesota. As the name Spinal Cord Society Canada was a legitimate licensed charity in Canada under the auspices of the American headquarters, Wickson's formation of CSRO was done so in attempt to distance himself from them, but at the same time utilize the funds generated under their name. He even went so far as to litigate the release of funds from Chapters that refused to follow his attempt to tear apart the organization. Wickson eventually paid himself out of these funds because up to this point his involvement was purely on a volunteer basis. CSRO now became a way for him and his new recruit Barry Munro to secure paid positions.

Together, Munro and Wickson using the funds generated under the banner of SCS, formed the CSRO to legitimize their new requirement of receiving a financial remuneration. Initially, operating out of Wickson's house, the charity generated approximately $25,000 in the first few years. On June 12, 1992, the organization changed its name to the Canadian Spinal Research Organization from SCSC to distance their volunteer past.

== Mission ==
The Canadian Spinal Research Organization is dedicated to the improvement of the physical quality of life for persons with a spinal cord injury and those with related neurological deficits, through targeted medical and scientific research. The CSRO is also committed to the reduction of spinal cord injuries through awareness programs for the general public and prevention programs for targeted groups.

== SCI and CSRO research ==
The CSRO strives to find a cure for paralysis and improve the quality of life for people with spinal cord injuries by funding SCI research. Ninety percent of what we know about SCI has been discovered in the last 20 years. Currently, there is no cure for SCI; however, there have been many advances in the laboratories around the world.

=== Research previously funded by the CSRO ===
The CSRO has supported a number of research efforts over the years, leading to promising discoveries and therapies. A great accomplishment of the CSRO came in late January 2010. After 20 years of development, CSRO and Acorda Therapeutics announced marketing approval from the U.S. Food and Drug Administration for Ampyra (generic name dalfampridine), an oral treatment to improve walking in patients with multiple sclerosis (MS). The CSRO has also funded the administration of L1 in promoting nerve regeneration, and Clenbuterol-a potential therapeutic aid towards the limitation of muscle wasting associated with spinal cord injuries.

=== Projects currently funded by the CSRO ===
Currently the CSRO is funding Gene Therapy as well as Enteric Glia.

=== Cure and care research ===
Cure research focuses on the causes of a condition or illness and seeks to not only arrest deterioration, but also reverse the process, thereby achieving complete recovery. While there are a great number of studies, realistically there will not be a solitary finding that provides "the silver bullet" to cure SCI. More probable is the discrete development of a multitude of therapies that used in combination will enable individuals to return to the level of functioning they experience pre-injury. The current areas of cure research are neuroprotection, regeneration, transplantation, and rehabilitation.

Care research focuses on the means of improving the quality of life for individuals living with SCI. One means of achieving increased quality of life is by advancing the ability of persons with SCI to function successfully within the community. Researchers make strides in this area by investigating and improving "best practice models", which caregivers, peers and family members use to treat and educate consumers. One of the primary goals of early intervention and stabilization is to promote the recovery of function. Typically, care oriented research is conducted in clinical settings such as rehabilitation centers. The current areas of care research are physical and psychosocial.

== Fundraising and awareness ==
The CSRO and ASRO have organized several campaigns and programs that educate the general public about spinal cord injuries and raise money for spinal cord injury (SCI) research.

=== Shoot for a cure ===
One program that the CSRO has been involved in since 2000 is the Shoot For A Cure campaign. Initially involving only the hockey community, Shoot For A Cure has expanded to target the curling, motor-sport, and horse racing industries in order to raise awareness about spinal cord injuries in the general public and raise money for SCI research.

The Shoot For A Cure campaign also seeks to promote prevention of hockey-related spinal cord injuries through the Play it Cool prevention program. Since the induction of Shoot For A Cure, over $2,000,000 has been raised to further research and development for continued commitment to find a cure and prevent future injury.

=== Play it cool ===
A program under the Shoot For A Cure awareness campaign is the Play It Cool youth injury prevention program. Play It Cool is a skill enhancement program, which aims to reduce the incidence of neurotrauma in hockey. This program is used to equip minor hockey players with the knowledge and skills that may prevent a hockey-related spinal cord injury and is developed to target hockey players, parents, coaches, and officials. Built on the foundation of scientific research by Dr. William Montelpare at Lakehead University, the Play It Cool website is an online platform uniting partners from the hockey community across North America to ultimately be the solution for creating a safer more effective game of hockey.

Supporters of Play It Cool include:

- The CSRO and ASRO
- The Ontario Neurotrauma Foundation
- The Toronto Maple Leafs
- NHLPA
- Ontario Hockey Federation
- Lakehead University
- The Trillium Foundation
- Think First
