= UK-432,097 =

- Kekulé skeletal formula of UK-432,097

Names
- Systematic IUPAC name (1^{2}R,1^{3}R,1^{4}S,1^{5}S)-2^{6}-[(2,2-Diphenylethyl)amino]-N-ethyl-1^{3},1^{4}-dihydroxy-3,8-dioxo-4,7,9-triaza-2(9,2)-purina-11(2)-pyridina-10(4,1)-piperidina-1(2)-oxolanaundecaphane-1^{5}-carboxamide

Identifiers
CAS Number	380221-63-6
3D model (JSmol)	Interactive image; Interactive image
Abbreviations	UK-432,097
ChEMBL	ChEMBL1096896
ChemSpider	8009243
PubChem CID	9833519
UNII	8L3OAJ1R5A
CompTox Dashboard (EPA)	DTXSID70431408
- InChI: InChI=1S/C40H47N11O6/c1-2-41-37(54)33-31(52)32(53)39(57-33)51-24-46-30-34(45-23-28(25-11-5-3-6-12-25)26-13-7-4-8-14-26)48-35(49-36(30)51)38(55)43-19-20-44-40(56)47-27-16-21-50(22-17-27)29-15-9-10-18-42-29/h3-15,18,24,27-28,31-33,39,52-53H,2,16-17,19-23H2,1H3,(H,41,54)(H,43,55)(H2,44,47,56)(H,45,48,49)/t31-,32+,33-,39+/m0/s1 Key: ZOTHAEBAWXWVID-HXEFRTELSA-N
- SMILES: O=C(NCC)[C@H]([C@@H](O)[C@H]1O)O[C@H]1N2C=NC3=C(NCC(C4=CC=CC=C4)C5=CC=CC=C5)N=C(C(NCCNC(NC6CCN(C7=NC=CC=C7)CC6)=O)=O)N=C32; O=C(NC2CCN(c1ncccc1)CC2)NCCNC(=O)c5nc3c(ncn3[C@@H]4O[C@H](C(=O)NCC)[C@@H](O)[C@H]4O)c(n5)NCC(c6ccccc6)c7ccccc7

Properties
Chemical formula	C_{40}H_{47}N_{11}O_{6}
Molar mass	777.887 g·mol^{−1}
- Except where otherwise noted, data are given for materials in their standard state (at 25 °C [77 °F], 100 kPa). verify (what is ?) Infobox references

UK-432,097 is a drug developed by Pfizer for the treatment of chronic obstructive pulmonary disease, which acts as a potent and selective agonist of the adenosine A_{2A} receptor. It was discontinued from clinical trials following poor efficacy results, but its high selectivity has made it useful for detailed mapping of the internal structure of the A_{2A} receptor.
