= CGS-21680 =

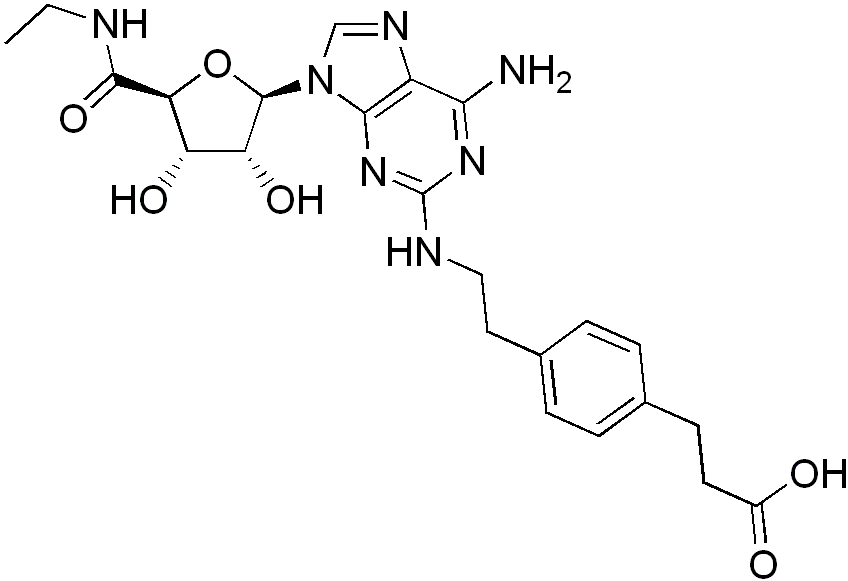

Names
- IUPAC name 3-[4-(2-{[6-Amino-9-(N-ethyl-β-D-ribofuranosyluronamide)-9H-purin-2-yl]amino}ethyl)phenyl]propanoic acid
- Systematic IUPAC name 3-{4-[2-({6-Amino-9-[(2R,3R,4S,5S)-5-(ethylcarbamoyl)-3,4-dihydroxyoxolan-2-yl]-9H-purin-2-yl}amino)ethyl]phenyl}propanoic acid
- Other names CGS 21680

Identifiers
CAS Number	120225-54-9
3D model (JSmol)	Interactive image
ChEBI	CHEBI:73283
ChEMBL	ChEMBL331372
ChemSpider	2343185
IUPHAR/BPS	375; 424
PubChem CID	3086599
UNII	T5HB1E831H
CompTox Dashboard (EPA)	DTXSID6043882
- InChI: InChI=1S/C23H29N7O6/c1-2-25-21(35)18-16(33)17(34)22(36-18)30-11-27-15-19(24)28-23(29-20(15)30)26-10-9-13-5-3-12(4-6-13)7-8-14(31)32/h3-6,11,16-18,22,33-34H,2,7-10H2,1H3,(H,25,35)(H,31,32)(H3,24,26,28,29)/t16-,17+,18-,22+/m0/s1 Key: PAOANWZGLPPROA-RQXXJAGISA-N; InChI=1/C23H29N7O6/c1-2-25-21(35)18-16(33)17(34)22(36-18)30-11-27-15-19(24)28-23(29-20(15)30)26-10-9-13-5-3-12(4-6-13)7-8-14(31)32/h3-6,11,16-18,22,33-34H,2,7-10H2,1H3,(H,25,35)(H,31,32)(H3,24,26,28,29)/t16-,17+,18-,22+/m0/s1 Key: PAOANWZGLPPROA-RQXXJAGIBL
- SMILES: O=C(O)CCc1ccc(cc1)CCNc2nc(c3ncn(c3n2)[C@@H]4O[C@H](C(=O)NCC)[C@@H](O)[C@H]4O)N

Properties
Chemical formula	C_{23}H_{29}N_{7}O_{6}
Molar mass	499.52
- Except where otherwise noted, data are given for materials in their standard state (at 25 °C [77 °F], 100 kPa). verify (what is ?) Infobox references

CGS-21680 is a specific adenosine A_{2A} subtype receptor agonist. It is usually presented as an organic hydrochloride salt with a molecular weight of 536.0 g/M. It is soluble up to 3.4 mg/mL in DMSO and 20 mg/mL in 45% (w/v) aq 2-hydroxypropyl-β-cyclodextrin.

The chemical is currently used by researchers interested in studying neuronal transmission with a high-affinity, subtype specific analogue for adenosine. This includes research in respiration where it is believed that A_{2A} receptors are involved in rhythm generation in the pre-Bötzinger complex. The drug is not currently approved for use in a therapeutic capacity.

== See also ==
- Adenosine receptor
