= Sipagladenant =

Clinical data
- Other names: KW-6356; KW6356
- Routes of administration: Oral
- Drug class: Adenosine A_{2A} receptor antagonist; Antiparkinsonian agent
- ATC code: None

Legal status
- Legal status: US: Not FDA approved; Investigational

Pharmacokinetic data
- Onset of action: 0.75–3 hours (T_{max})
- Elimination half-life: 18.4–43.1 hours

Identifiers
- IUPAC name: N-(4-(Furan-2-yl)-5-(tetrahydro-2H-pyran-4-carbonyl)thiazol-2-yl)-6-methylnicotinamide
- CAS Number: 858979-50-7
- PubChem CID: 23144148
- DrugBank: DB17080
- UNII: FF2012ZV92
- ChEMBL: ChEMBL5314441
- PDB ligand: JQR (PDBe, RCSB PDB)

Chemical and physical data
- Formula: C_{20}H_{19}N_{3}O_{4}S
- Molar mass: 397.45 g·mol^{−1}
- 3D model (JSmol): Interactive image
- SMILES: CC1=NC=C(C=C1)C(=O)NC2=NC(=C(S2)C(=O)C3CCOCC3)C4=CC=CO4
- InChI: InChI=1S/C20H19N3O4S/c1-12-4-5-14(11-21-12)19(25)23-20-22-16(15-3-2-8-27-15)18(28-20)17(24)13-6-9-26-10-7-13/h2-5,8,11,13H,6-7,9-10H2,1H3,(H,22,23,25); Key:KMFLQPJJHQNKKF-UHFFFAOYSA-N

Sipagladenant (INN; development codeKW-6356) is a non-xanthine selective antagonist or inverse agonist of the adenosine A_{2A} receptor that was previously under development by Kyowa Kirin as a monotherapy and adjunctive to levodopa therapy in Parkinsonism. It reached phase 2 clinical trials prior to the discontinuation of its development in 2022.

== Pharmacology ==
=== Pharmacodynamics ===
Sipagladenant is a selective A_{2A} adenosine antagonist or inverse agonist displaying insurmountable antagonism of this adenosine subtype. Compared to the first generation A_{2A} adenosine inverse agonist Istradefylline, KW-6356 possesses a 100-fold greater affinity for the A_{2A} adenosine receptor and dissociates more slowly from the receptor.

The metabolism of sipagladenant generates an active metabolite, denoted M6, with similar potency as an A_{2A} antagonist/inverse agonist.

=== Pharmacokinetics ===
The half-life of sipagladenant is 22.9 hours. The half-life of M6 is 4.34 hours.

== Development ==
Kyowa Kirin halted development of sipagladenant in 2022 based on regulatory and developmental challenges surrounding the drug.

== See also ==
- List of investigational Parkinson's disease drugs
