= Namodenoson =

Chemical compound

Clinical data
- Other names: Chloro-IB-MECA; 2-Cl-IB-MECA

Legal status
- Legal status: Investigational

Identifiers
- IUPAC name: (2S,3S,4R,5R)-5-[2-Chloro-6-[(3-iodophenyl)methylamino]purin-9-yl]-3,4-dihydroxy-N-methyloxolane-2-carboxamide
- CAS Number: 163042-96-4
- PubChem CID: 3035850
- IUPHAR/BPS: 457
- DrugBank: DB12885
- ChemSpider: 2299989
- UNII: Z07JR07J6C
- KEGG: D11128
- ChEMBL: ChEMBL431733
- CompTox Dashboard (EPA): DTXSID80167504
- ECHA InfoCard: 100.162.091

Chemical and physical data
- Formula: C_{18}H_{18}ClIN_{6}O_{4}
- Molar mass: 544.73 g·mol^{−1}
- 3D model (JSmol): Interactive image
- SMILES: CNC(=O)[C@@H]1[C@H]([C@H]([C@@H](O1)N2C=NC3=C(N=C(N=C32)Cl)NCC4=CC(=CC=C4)I)O)O
- InChI: InChI=1S/C18H18ClIN6O4/c1-21-16(29)13-11(27)12(28)17(30-13)26-7-23-10-14(24-18(19)25-15(10)26)22-6-8-3-2-4-9(20)5-8/h2-5,7,11-13,17,27-28H,6H2,1H3,(H,21,29)(H,22,24,25)/t11-,12+,13-,17+/m0/s1; Key:IPSYPUKKXMNCNQ-PFHKOEEOSA-N

Namodenoson is a small molecule A3 adenosine receptor (A3AR) agonist. It is developed by Can-Fite for non-alcoholic fatty liver disease, liver cancer, and pancreatic cancer.
