= ATL-444 =

Chemical compound

Identifiers
- IUPAC name: (1S,3R)-1-[2-(6-amino-9-prop-2-ynylpurin-2-yl)ethynyl]-3-methylcyclohexan-1-ol
- CAS Number: 867054-13-5
- PubChem CID: 11616539
- ChemSpider: 9791288
- UNII: Y29E2DV2VU
- CompTox Dashboard (EPA): DTXSID301030411

Chemical and physical data
- Formula: C_{17}H_{19}N_{5}O
- Molar mass: 309.373 g·mol^{−1}
- 3D model (JSmol): Interactive image
- SMILES: C#CCN1C=NC2=C1N=C(C#C[C@@]3(CCC[C@H](C3)C)O)N=C2N
- InChI: InChI=1S/C17H19N5O/c1-3-9-22-11-19-14-15(18)20-13(21-16(14)22)6-8-17(23)7-4-5-12(2)10-17/h1,11-12,23H,4-5,7,9-10H2,2H3,(H2,18,20,21)/t12-,17-/m1/s1; Key:VEJLEEFUXFQSHP-SJKOYZFVSA-N

ATL-444 is a drug which acts as a potent and reasonably selective antagonist for the adenosine receptors A_{1} and A_{2A}. It has been used to study the role of the adenosine receptor system in the reinforcing action of cocaine, as well as the development of some cancers.

== See also ==
- CGS-15943
