= SCH-442,416 =

Names
- Preferred IUPAC name 2-(Furan-2-yl)-7-[3-(4-methoxyphenyl)propyl]-7H-pyrazolo[4,3-e][1,2,4]triazolo[1,5-c]pyrimidin-5-amine
- Other names SCH-442,416

Identifiers
CAS Number	316173-57-6
3D model (JSmol)	Interactive image
ChEMBL	ChEMBL136689
ChemSpider	8843413
IUPHAR/BPS	3283
PubChem CID	10668061
UNII	ZMC4G1W59S
CompTox Dashboard (EPA)	DTXSID70443263
- InChI: InChI=1S/C20H19N7O2/c1-28-14-8-6-13(7-9-14)4-2-10-26-18-15(12-22-26)19-23-17(16-5-3-11-29-16)25-27(19)20(21)24-18/h3,5-9,11-12H,2,4,10H2,1H3,(H2,21,24) Key: AEULVFLPCJOBCE-UHFFFAOYSA-N; InChI=1/C20H19N7O2/c1-28-14-8-6-13(7-9-14)4-2-10-26-18-15(12-22-26)19-23-17(16-5-3-11-29-16)25-27(19)20(21)24-18/h3,5-9,11-12H,2,4,10H2,1H3,(H2,21,24) Key: AEULVFLPCJOBCE-UHFFFAOYAA
- SMILES: n1n3c(nc4c(c3nc1c2occc2)cnn4CCCc5ccc(OC)cc5)N

Properties
Chemical formula	C_{20}H_{19}N_{7}O_{2}
Molar mass	389.410
- Except where otherwise noted, data are given for materials in their standard state (at 25 °C [77 °F], 100 kPa). verify (what is ?) Infobox references

SCH-442,416 is a highly selective adenosine A_{2a} subtype receptor antagonist. It is widely used in its ^{11}C radiolabelled form to map the distribution of A_{2a} receptors in the brain, where they are mainly found in the striatum, nucleus accumbens, and olfactory tubercle. Given its distribution in the brain, A_{2a} receptors have been investigated for the treatment of various neurological disorders, and SCH-442,416 has shown promise in treatment of depression, Parkinson's disease, and catalepsy.
