= CP-532,903 =

Names
- IUPAC name 6-{[(2,5-Dichlorophenyl)methyl]amino}-9H-purin-9-yl 3-amino-3-deoxy-N-methyl-β-D-ribofuranosiduronamide
- Systematic IUPAC name (2S,3S,4R,5R)-3-Amino-5-(6-{[(2,5-dichlorophenyl)methyl]amino}-9H-purin-9-yl)-4-hydroxy-N^{5}-methyloxolane-2-carboxamide
- Other names CP-532,903

Identifiers
CAS Number	457612-59-8
3D model (JSmol)	Interactive image; Interactive image
ChemSpider	8654410
PubChem CID	10479002
UNII	J233Z26QH5
CompTox Dashboard (EPA)	DTXSID40440587
- InChI: InChI=1S/C18H19Cl2N7O3/c1-22-17(29)14-11(21)13(28)18(30-14)27-7-26-12-15(24-6-25-16(12)27)23-5-8-4-9(19)2-3-10(8)20/h2-4,6-7,11,13-14,18,28H,5,21H2,1H3,(H,22,29)(H,23,24,25)/t11-,13+,14-,18+/m0/s1 Key: WFRYPIJMCFQCGT-MHMFGPJMSA-N; InChI=1/C18H19Cl2N7O3/c1-22-17(29)14-11(21)13(28)18(30-14)27-7-26-12-15(24-6-25-16(12)27)23-5-8-4-9(19)2-3-10(8)20/h2-4,6-7,11,13-14,18,28H,5,21H2,1H3,(H,22,29)(H,23,24,25)/t11-,13+,14-,18+/m0/s1 Key: WFRYPIJMCFQCGT-MHMFGPJMBE
- SMILES: Clc3ccc(Cl)cc3CNc(c1nc4)ncnc1n4C(C(O)C2N)OC2C(=O)NC; Clc1cc(c(Cl)cc1)CNc4ncnc2c4ncn2[C@@H]3O[C@H](C(=O)NC)[C@@H](N)[C@H]3O

Properties
Chemical formula	C_{18}H_{19}Cl_{2}N_{7}O_{3}
Molar mass	452.30 g·mol^{−1}
- Except where otherwise noted, data are given for materials in their standard state (at 25 °C [77 °F], 100 kPa). verify (what is ?) Infobox references

CP-532,903 is a selective adenosine A_{3} subtype receptor agonist. It has antiinflammatory effects and has been shown to reduce superoxide generation in damaged tissues, and protects against tissue damage following myocardial ischemia, mediated via an interaction with ATP-sensitive potassium channels.
