= BAY 60–6583 =

Names
- Preferred IUPAC name 2-({6-Amino-3,5-dicyano-4-[4-(cyclopropylmethoxy)phenyl]pyridin-2-yl}sulfanyl)acetamide
- Other names BAY 60–6583

Identifiers
CAS Number	910487-58-0
3D model (JSmol)	Interactive image
ChemSpider	9892551
IUPHAR/BPS	3289
PubChem CID	11717831
UNII	UAT5472LHH
CompTox Dashboard (EPA)	DTXSID301028169
- InChI: InChI=1S/C19H17N5O2S/c20-7-14-17(12-3-5-13(6-4-12)26-9-11-1-2-11)15(8-21)19(24-18(14)23)27-10-16(22)25/h3-6,11H,1-2,9-10H2,(H2,22,25)(H2,23,24) Key: ZTYHZMAZUWOXNC-UHFFFAOYSA-N; InChI=1/C19H17N5O2S/c20-7-14-17(12-3-5-13(6-4-12)26-9-11-1-2-11)15(8-21)19(24-18(14)23)27-10-16(22)25/h3-6,11H,1-2,9-10H2,(H2,22,25)(H2,23,24) Key: ZTYHZMAZUWOXNC-UHFFFAOYAY
- SMILES: N#Cc1c(SCC(N)=O)nc(N)c(C#N)c1-c3ccc(cc3)OCC2CC2

Properties
Chemical formula	C_{19}H_{17}N_{5}O_{2}S
Molar mass	379.435
- Except where otherwise noted, data are given for materials in their standard state (at 25 °C [77 °F], 100 kPa). Infobox references

BAY 60–6583 is a selective adenosine A_{2B} receptor agonist. It has been shown to provide protection from ischemia (lack of oxygen due to blocked blood supply) in both the heart and kidney of test animals, and has also been shown to be beneficial in treatment of acute lung and brain injury, as well as claimed anti-aging and anti-obesity effects, showing a range of potential applications for selective A_{2B} agonists.
