= MRS-1706 =

Names
- IUPAC name N-(4-Acetylphenyl)-2-[4-(2,3,6,7-tetrahydro-2,6-dioxo-1,3-dipropyl-1H-purin-8-yl)phenoxy]acetamide
- Other names MRS 1706

Identifiers
CAS Number	264622-53-9
3D model (JSmol)	Interactive image
ChemSpider	4313008
IUPHAR/BPS	3287
MeSH	C496145
PubChem CID	5139184
UNII	YEE5LME5K5
CompTox Dashboard (EPA)	DTXSID40408687
- InChI: InChI=1S/C27H29N5O5/c1-4-14-31-25-23(26(35)32(15-5-2)27(31)36)29-24(30-25)19-8-12-21(13-9-19)37-16-22(34)28-20-10-6-18(7-11-20)17(3)33/h6-13H,4-5,14-16H2,1-3H3,(H,28,34)(H,29,30) Key: ZKUCFFYOQOJLGT-UHFFFAOYSA-N; InChI=1/C27H29N5O5/c1-4-14-31-25-23(26(35)32(15-5-2)27(31)36)29-24(30-25)19-8-12-21(13-9-19)37-16-22(34)28-20-10-6-18(7-11-20)17(3)33/h6-13H,4-5,14-16H2,1-3H3,(H,28,34)(H,29,30) Key: ZKUCFFYOQOJLGT-UHFFFAOYAX
- SMILES: CCCN1C2=C(C(=O)N(C1=O)CCC)NC(=N2)C3=CC=C(C=C3)OCC(=O)NC4=CC=C(C=C4)C(=O)C

Properties
Chemical formula	C_{27}H_{29}N_{5}O_{5}
Molar mass	503.56
- Except where otherwise noted, data are given for materials in their standard state (at 25 °C [77 °F], 100 kPa). verify (what is ?) Infobox references

MRS-1706 is a selective inverse agonist for the adenosine A_{2B} receptor. It inhibits release of interleukins and has an antiinflammatory effect.
