= ZM-241,385 =

Names
- Preferred IUPAC name 4-(2-{[7-Amino-2-(furan-2-yl)[1,2,4]triazolo[1,5-a][1,3,5]triazin-5-yl]amino}ethyl)phenol

Identifiers
CAS Number	139180-30-6
3D model (JSmol)	Interactive image
ChEMBL	ChEMBL113142
ChemSpider	153646
ECHA InfoCard	100.216.533
IUPHAR/BPS	405
PubChem CID	176407
UNII	5NIC36BO71
CompTox Dashboard (EPA)	DTXSID80160954
- InChI: InChI=1S/C16H15N7O2/c17-14-20-15(18-8-7-10-3-5-11(24)6-4-10)21-16-19-13(22-23(14)16)12-2-1-9-25-12/h1-6,9,24H,7-8H2,(H3,17,18,19,20,21,22) Key: PWTBZOIUWZOPFT-UHFFFAOYSA-N; InChI=1/C16H15N7O2/c17-14-20-15(18-8-7-10-3-5-11(24)6-4-10)21-16-19-13(22-23(14)16)12-2-1-9-25-12/h1-6,9,24H,7-8H2,(H3,17,18,19,20,21,22) Key: PWTBZOIUWZOPFT-UHFFFAOYAJ
- SMILES: Oc1ccc(CCNc2nc3nc(c4ccco4)nn3c(N)n2)cc1

Properties
Chemical formula	C_{16}H_{15}N_{7}O_{2}
Molar mass	337.343 g·mol^{−1}
- Except where otherwise noted, data are given for materials in their standard state (at 25 °C [77 °F], 100 kPa). verify (what is ?) Infobox references

ZM-241,385 is a high affinity antagonist ligand selective for the adenosine A_{2A} receptor.

In animal models, ZM-241,385 has been shown to protect against beta amyloid neurotoxicity and therefore may be useful as a treatment for Alzheimer's disease. ZM-241,385 has also been shown to enhance L-DOPA derived dopamine release and therefore may be useful in the treatment of Parkinson's disease.
