= 5′-(N-Ethylcarboxamido)adenosine =

5'-(N-Ethylcarboxamido)adenosine

Names
- IUPAC name (2S,3S,4R,5R)-5-(6-Aminopurin-9-yl)-N-ethyl-3,4-dihydroxyoxolane-2-carboxamide
- Other names 5'-Ethylcarboxamido adenosine; NECA

Identifiers
| CAS Number | 35920-39-9 |
| 3D model (JSmol) | Interactive image |
| ChEBI | CHEBI:73284 |
| ChEMBL | ChEMBL464859 |
| ChemSpider | 395094 |
| ECHA InfoCard | 100.164.621 |
| EC Number | 636-060-5 |
| IUPHAR/BPS | 377 |
| PubChem CID | 448222 |
| UNII | 3WC8SJ5ZLJ |
| CompTox Dashboard (EPA) | DTXSID801017234 |
- InChI: InChI=1S/C12H16N6O4/c1-2-14-11(21)8-6(19)7(20)12(22-8)18-4-17-5-9(13)15-3-16-10(5)18/h3-4,6-8,12,19-20H,2H2,1H3,(H,14,21)(H2,13,15,16)/t6-,7+,8-,12+/m0/s1 Key: JADDQZYHOWSFJD-FLNNQWSLSA-N
- SMILES: CCNC(=O)[C@@H]1[C@H]([C@H]([C@@H](O1)N2C=NC3=C(N=CN=C32)N)O)O

Properties
| Chemical formula | C_{12}H_{16}N_{6}O_{4} |
| Molar mass | 308.298 g·mol^{−1} |
- Except where otherwise noted, data are given for materials in their standard state (at 25 °C [77 °F], 100 kPa). Infobox references

5'-(N-Ethylcarboxamido)adenosine (NECA) is a nucleoside that is a non-selective adenosine receptor agonist. It has been used as a biochemical tool in the study of the function of adenosine receptors.
