= Regadenoson =

Chemical compound

Clinical data
- Trade names: Lexiscan, Rapiscan
- Other names: CVT-3146, 1-[6-amino-9-[(2R,3R,4S,5R)-3,4-dihydroxy-5-(hydroxymethyl)oxolan-2-yl]purin-2-yl]- N-methylpyrazole-4-carboxamide
- AHFS/Drugs.com: Monograph
- License data: US DailyMed: Regadenoson
- Routes of administration: Intravenous
- ATC code: C01EB21 (WHO)

Legal status
- Legal status: US: ℞-only; In general: ℞ (Prescription only)

Identifiers
- IUPAC name: 2-{4-[(methylamino)carbonyl]- 1H-pyrazol-1-yl}adenosine
- CAS Number: 313348-27-5 875148-45-1
- PubChem CID: 219024
- IUPHAR/BPS: 5596
- DrugBank: DB06213
- ChemSpider: 189859
- UNII: 7AXV542LZ4
- KEGG: D05711
- ChEMBL: ChEMBL1201750
- CompTox Dashboard (EPA): DTXSID4057712
- ECHA InfoCard: 100.218.278

Chemical and physical data
- Formula: C_{15}H_{18}N_{8}O_{5}
- Molar mass: 390.360 g·mol^{−1}
- 3D model (JSmol): Interactive image
- SMILES: CNC(=O)C1=CN(N=C1)C2=NC(=C3C(=N2)N(C=N3)[C@H]4[C@@H]([C@@H]([C@H](O4)CO)O)O)N
- InChI: InChI=1S/C15H18N8O5/c1-17-13(27)6-2-19-23(3-6)15-20-11(16)8-12(21-15)22(5-18-8)14-10(26)9(25)7(4-24)28-14/h2-3,5,7,9-10,14,24-26H,4H2,1H3,(H,17,27)(H2,16,20,21)/t7-,9-,10-,14-/m1/s1; Key:LZPZPHGJDAGEJZ-AKAIJSEGSA-N

Regadenoson, sold under the brand name Lexiscan among others, is an A_{2A} adenosine receptor agonist that is a coronary vasodilator that is commonly used in pharmacologic stress testing. It produces hyperemia quickly and maintains it for a duration that is useful for radionuclide myocardial perfusion imaging. The selective nature of the drug makes it preferable to other stress agents such as adenosine, which are less selective and therefore cause more side-effects.

Regadenoson was approved by the United States Food and Drug Administration on April 10, 2008, and is marketed by Astellas Pharma under the tradename Lexiscan. It is approved for use in the European Union and under the name of Rapiscan. It is marketed by GE Healthcare and is sold in both the United Kingdom and Germany. Regadenoson was approved for use in the European Union in September 2010. It is available as a generic medication.

Regadenoson has a two- to three-minute biological half-life, as compared with adenosine's ten-second half-life. As a result, regadenoson stress protocols use a single bolus, instead of the four- to six-minute continuous infusion that was needed with adenosine. Whereas the adenosine infusion is weight based (140 mcg/kg/minute), regadenoson is administered as a 0.4 mg/5mL preloaded syringe dose that is standard for all weights. Regadenoson stress tests are not affected by the presence of beta blockers, as regadenoson vasodilates via the adenosine pathway without stimulating beta adrenergic receptors.

Regadenoson can temporarily disrupt the integrity of the blood–brain barrier by inhibiting P-glycoprotein function.
