= Adenosine A2B receptor =

Cell surface receptor found in humans

ADORA2B

Identifiers
- Aliases: ADORA2B, ADORA2, adenosine A2b receptor
- External IDs: OMIM: 600446; MGI: 99403; GeneCards: ADORA2B

Gene location (Human)
Chr.	Chromosome 17 (human)
Band	17p12	Start	15,945,130 bp
Band	17p12	End	15,975,746 bp

Gene location (Mouse)
Chr.	Chromosome 11 (mouse)
Band	11|11 B2	Start	62,139,810 bp
Band	11|11 B2	End	62,157,279 bp
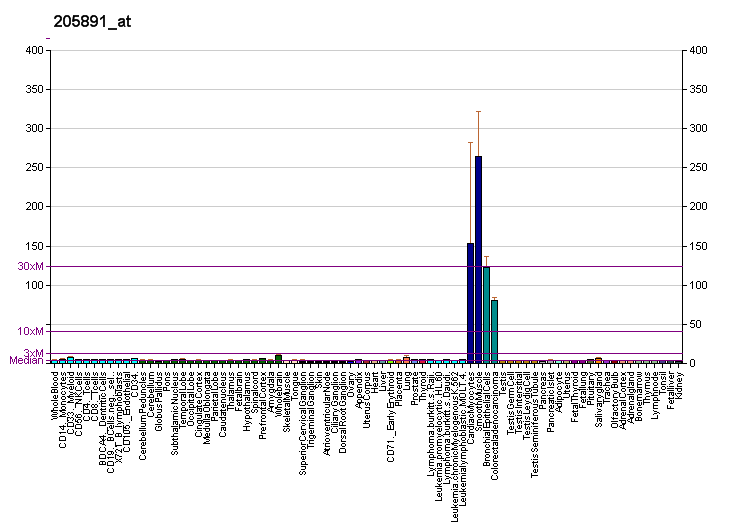
RNA expression pattern
Bgee	Human / Mouse (ortholog); Top expressed in: mucosa of transverse colon; bronchial epithelial cell; retinal pigment epithelium; mucosa of sigmoid colon; gonad; olfactory zone of nasal mucosa; mucosa of paranasal sinus; nasal epithelium; skin of thigh; testicle / Top expressed in: gastrula; retinal pigment epithelium; yolk sac; corneal stroma; Epithelium of choroid plexus; decidua; otic placode; lumbar subsegment of spinal cord; embryo; primary oocyte; More reference expression data
BioGPS	More reference expression data
Gene ontology
Molecular function	G protein-coupled adenosine receptor activity; G protein-coupled receptor activity; signal transducer activity
Cellular component	integral component of membrane; membrane; plasma membrane; integral component of plasma membrane; intracellular anatomical structure; synapse; Schaffer collateral - CA1 synapse; glutamatergic synapse
Biological process	cellular response to extracellular stimulus; positive regulation of chronic inflammatory response to non-antigenic stimulus; G protein-coupled receptor signaling pathway; G protein-coupled adenosine receptor signaling pathway; excretion; positive regulation of guanylate cyclase activity; adenylate cyclase-activating G protein-coupled receptor signaling pathway; positive regulation of mast cell degranulation; activation of adenylate cyclase activity; cellular defense response; JNK cascade; positive regulation of interleukin-6 production; relaxation of vascular associated smooth muscle; positive regulation of chemokine production; positive regulation of vascular endothelial growth factor production; signal transduction; positive regulation of cGMP-mediated signaling; regulation of synaptic vesicle exocytosis
Sources:Amigo / QuickGO
Orthologs
Databases	NCBI: entry; OMA: entry
Species	Human	Mouse
Entrez	136	11541
Ensembl	ENSG00000170425	ENSMUSG00000018500
UniProt	P29275	Q60614
RefSeq (mRNA)	NM_000676	NM_007413
RefSeq (protein)	NP_000667	NP_031439
Location (UCSC)	Chr 17: 15.95 – 15.98 Mb	Chr 11: 62.14 – 62.16 Mb
PubMed search
- Wikidata
View/Edit Human	View/Edit Mouse

The adenosine A_{2B} receptor, also known as ADORA2B, is a G-protein coupled adenosine receptor, and also denotes the human adenosine A_{2b} receptor gene which encodes it.

== Mechanism ==
This integral membrane protein stimulates adenylate cyclase activity in the presence of adenosine. This protein also interacts with netrin-1, which is involved in axon elongation.

== Gene ==
The gene is located near the Smith-Magenis syndrome region on chromosome 17.

== Ligands ==
Research into selective A_{2B} ligands has lagged somewhat behind the development of ligands for the other three adenosine receptor subtypes, but a number of A_{2B}-selective compounds have now been developed, and research into their potential therapeutic applications is ongoing.

=== Agonists ===
- BAY 60-6583
- NECA (N-ethylcarboxamidoadenosine)
- (S)-PHPNECA - high affinity and efficacy at A_{2B}, but poor selectivity over other adenosine receptor subtypes
- LUF-5835
- LUF-5845 - partial agonist

=== Antagonists and inverse agonists ===
- Compound 38: antagonist, high affinity and good subtype selectivity
- ISAM-R56A: non-xanthinic high affinity selective antagonist (K_{i}: 1.50 nM)
- ISAM-140: non-xanthinic selective antagonist (K_{i} = 3.49 nM).
- ISAM-R324A: Soluble and metabolically stable non-xanthinic selective antagonist (K_{i} = 6.10 nM).
- ATL-801
- CVT-6883
- MRS-1706
- MRS-1754
- OSIP-339,391
- PSB-603: xanthinic antagonist
- PSB-0788: xanthinic antagonist
- PSB-1115: xanthinic antagonist
- PSB-1901: xanthinic antagonist with picomolar potency
- Caffeine: low affinity for the A_{2B} receptor.
