= Adenosine A3 receptor =

Cell surface receptor found in humans

ADORA3

Identifiers
- Aliases: ADORA3, A3AR, AD026, bA552M11.5, adenosine A3 receptor
- External IDs: OMIM: 600445; MGI: 104847; GeneCards: ADORA3
Available structures
PDB	Ortholog search: PDBe RCSB
PDB	List of PDB id codes 1OEA, 1R7N

Gene location (Human)
Chr.	Chromosome 1 (human)
Band	1p13.2	Start	111,499,429 bp
Band	1p13.2	End	111,503,633 bp

Gene location (Mouse)
Chr.	Chromosome 3 (mouse)
Band	3 F2.2|3 46.45 cM	Start	105,778,174 bp
Band	3 F2.2|3 46.45 cM	End	105,816,242 bp
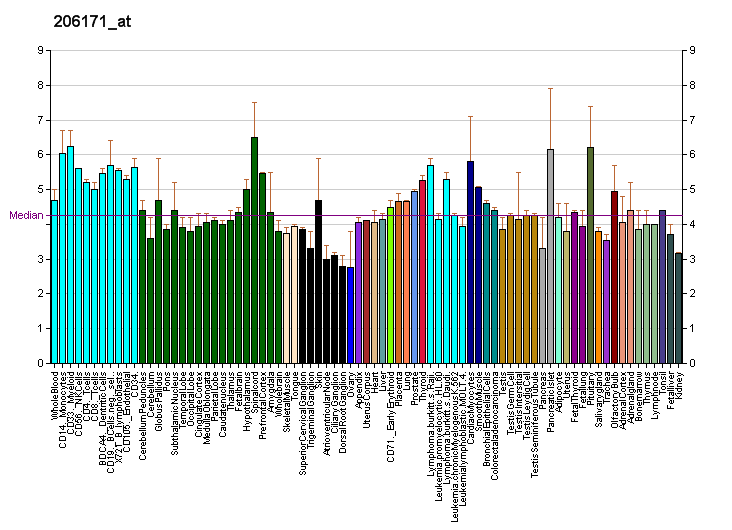
RNA expression pattern
Bgee	Human / Mouse (ortholog); Top expressed in: C1 segment; right adrenal cortex; left adrenal gland; left adrenal cortex; inferior ganglion of vagus nerve; mucosa of transverse colon; substantia nigra; Descending thoracic aorta; gallbladder; internal globus pallidus / Top expressed in: granulocyte; spermatid; embryo; red pulp; morula; blastocyst; lip; dermis; dentate gyrus of hippocampal formation granule cell; superior frontal gyrus; More reference expression data
BioGPS	More reference expression data
Gene ontology
Molecular function	G protein-coupled adenosine receptor activity; G protein-coupled receptor activity; signal transducer activity
Cellular component	integral component of membrane; plasma membrane; membrane; integral component of plasma membrane
Biological process	G protein-coupled adenosine receptor signaling pathway; inflammatory response; signal transduction; activation of adenylate cyclase activity; regulation of heart contraction; response to wounding; negative regulation of cell population proliferation; negative regulation of cell migration; negative regulation of NF-kappaB transcription factor activity; G protein-coupled receptor signaling pathway
Sources:Amigo / QuickGO
Orthologs
Databases	NCBI: entry; OMA: entry
Species	Human	Mouse
Entrez	140	11542
Ensembl	ENSG00000282608	ENSMUSG00000000562
UniProt	P0DMS8	Q61618; Q3U4C5
RefSeq (mRNA)	NM_001302679; NM_000677; NM_001302678	NM_009631
RefSeq (protein)	NP_000668; NP_001289607; NP_001289608	NP_033761
Location (UCSC)	Chr 1: 111.5 – 111.5 Mb	Chr 3: 105.78 – 105.82 Mb
PubMed search
- Wikidata
View/Edit Human	View/Edit Mouse

The adenosine A_{3} receptor, also known as ADORA3, is an adenosine receptor, but also denotes the human gene encoding it.

== Function ==
Adenosine A_{3} receptors are G protein-coupled receptors that couple to Gi/Gq and are involved in a variety of intracellular signaling pathways and physiological functions. It mediates a sustained cardioprotective function during cardiac ischemia, it is involved in the inhibition of neutrophil degranulation in neutrophil-mediated tissue injury, it has been implicated in both neuroprotective and neurodegenerative effects, and it may also mediate both cell proliferation and cell death. Recent publications demonstrate that adenosine A3 receptor antagonists (SSR161421) could have therapeutic potential in bronchial asthma (17,18).

== Gene ==
Multiple transcript variants encoding different isoforms have been found for this gene.

== Therapeutic implications ==
An adenosine A_{3} receptor agonist (CF-101) is in clinical trials for the treatment of rheumatoid arthritis. In a mouse model of infarction the A_{3} selective agonist CP-532,903 protected against myocardial ischemia and reperfusion injury.

== Selective Ligands ==
A number of selective A_{3} ligands are available.

=== Agonists/Positive Allosteric Modulators ===
- 2-(1-Hexynyl)-N-methyladenosine
- CF-101 (IB-MECA)/Piclidenoson
- CF-102 (2-Cl-IB-MECA)/Namodenoson
- CP-532,903
- Inosine
- LUF6000
- MRS-3558
- MRS7292
- AST-004
- CF 602

=== Antagonists/Negative Allosteric Modulators ===
- KF-26777
- MRS-545
- MRS-1191
- MRS-1220
- MRS-1334
- MRS-1523
- MRS-3777
- MRE-3005-F20
- MRE-3008-F20
- PSB-11
- OT-7999
- VUF-5574
- SSR161421
- ISAM-DM10

=== Inverse Agonists ===
- PSB-10
