= Adenosine A2A receptor =

Cell surface receptor found in humans

ADORA2A
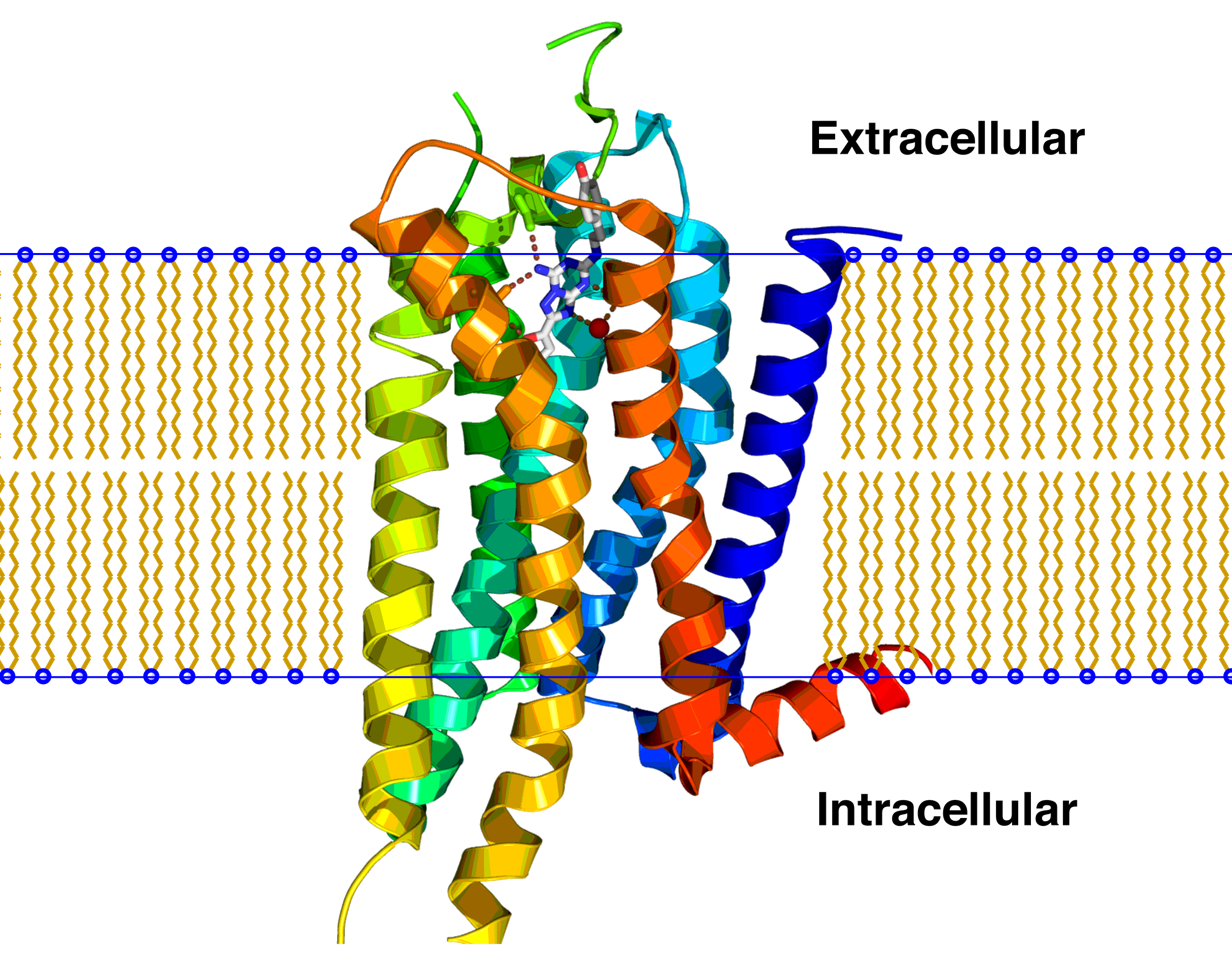

Identifiers
- Aliases: ADORA2A, adenosine A2a receptor, A2aR, ADORA2, RDC8
- External IDs: OMIM: 102776; MGI: 99402; GeneCards: ADORA2A
Available structures
PDB	Ortholog search: PDBe RCSB
PDB	List of PDB id codes 2YDO, 2YDV, 3EML, 3PWH, 3QAK, 3REY, 3RFM, 3UZA, 3UZC, 3VG9, 3VGA, 4EIY, 4UG2, 4UHR, 5IU4, 5IU7, 5IUA, 5IU8, 5IUB

Gene location (Human)
Chr.	Chromosome 22 (human)
Band	22q11.23	Start	24,417,879 bp
Band	22q11.23	End	24,442,357 bp

Gene location (Mouse)
Chr.	Chromosome 10 (mouse)
Band	10|10 C1	Start	75,152,711 bp
Band	10|10 C1	End	75,170,618 bp
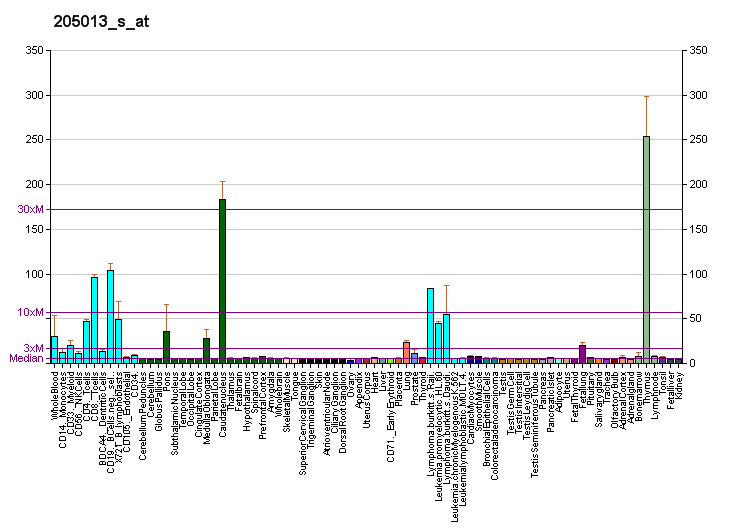
RNA expression pattern
Bgee	Human / Mouse (ortholog); Top expressed in: putamen; caudate nucleus; nucleus accumbens; blood; bone marrow; right lobe of liver; lymph node; apex of heart; granulocyte; bone marrow cell / Top expressed in: olfactory tubercle; superior frontal gyrus; perirhinal cortex; Ileal epithelium; globus pallidus; nucleus accumbens; entorhinal cortex; embryo; thymus; primary visual cortex; More reference expression data
BioGPS	More reference expression data
Gene ontology
Molecular function	G protein-coupled adenosine receptor activity; G protein-coupled receptor activity; signal transducer activity; protein binding; identical protein binding; enzyme binding; alpha-actinin binding; type 5 metabotropic glutamate receptor binding; protein heterodimerization activity
Cellular component	integral component of membrane; membrane; plasma membrane; integral component of plasma membrane; intermediate filament; endomembrane system; postsynaptic density; axon; dendrite; axolemma; asymmetric synapse; presynaptic membrane; soma; postsynaptic membrane; presynaptic active zone; integral component of postsynaptic membrane; integral component of presynaptic membrane; glutamatergic synapse; Golgi membrane
Biological process	cAMP biosynthetic process; G protein-coupled adenosine receptor signaling pathway; sensory perception; adenylate cyclase-modulating G protein-coupled receptor signaling pathway; cell-cell signaling; blood coagulation; blood circulation; cellular defense response; central nervous system development; phagocytosis; inflammatory response; signal transduction; apoptotic process; synaptic transmission, dopaminergic; response to amphetamine; regulation of transcription, DNA-templated; negative regulation of protein kinase activity; protein kinase C-activating G protein-coupled receptor signaling pathway; synaptic transmission, cholinergic; locomotory behavior; negative regulation of cell population proliferation; positive regulation of glutamate secretion; positive regulation of acetylcholine secretion, neurotransmission; regulation of norepinephrine secretion; response to caffeine; positive regulation of synaptic transmission, GABAergic; synaptic transmission, glutamatergic; positive regulation of urine volume; positive regulation of renal sodium excretion; negative regulation of locomotion; vasodilation; eating behavior; negative regulation of vascular permeability; negative regulation of cysteine-type endopeptidase activity involved in apoptotic process; response to alkaloid; negative regulation of neuron apoptotic process; positive regulation of circadian sleep/wake cycle, sleep; negative regulation of alpha-beta T cell activation; astrocyte activation; neuron projection morphogenesis; positive regulation of protein secretion; negative regulation of inflammatory response; regulation of mitochondrial membrane potential; membrane depolarization; regulation of calcium ion transport; positive regulation of synaptic transmission, glutamatergic; excitatory postsynaptic potential; inhibitory postsynaptic potential; prepulse inhibition; positive regulation of apoptotic signaling pathway; G protein-coupled receptor signaling pathway; adenylate cyclase-activating G protein-coupled receptor signaling pathway; positive regulation of long-term synaptic potentiation; regulation of synaptic vesicle exocytosis
Sources:Amigo / QuickGO
Orthologs
Databases	NCBI: entry; OMA: entry
Species	Human	Mouse
Entrez	135	11540
Ensembl	ENSG00000128271	ENSMUSG00000020178
UniProt	P29274	Q60613
RefSeq (mRNA)	NM_000675; NM_001278497; NM_001278498; NM_001278499; NM_001278500	NM_009630; NM_001331095; NM_001331096
RefSeq (protein)	NP_000666; NP_001265426; NP_001265427; NP_001265428; NP_001265429	NP_001318024; NP_001318025; NP_033760
Location (UCSC)	Chr 22: 24.42 – 24.44 Mb	Chr 10: 75.15 – 75.17 Mb
PubMed search
- Wikidata
View/Edit Human	View/Edit Mouse

The adenosine A_{2A} receptor, also known as ADORA2A, is an adenosine receptor, and also denotes the human gene encoding it.

== Structure ==
This protein is a member of the G protein-coupled receptor (GPCR) family which possess seven transmembrane alpha helices, as well as an extracellular N-terminus and an intracellular C-terminus. Furthermore, located in the intracellular side close to the membrane is a small alpha helix, often referred to as helix 8 (H8). The crystallographic structure of the adenosine A_{2A} receptor reveals a ligand binding pocket distinct from that of other structurally determined GPCRs (i.e., the beta-2 adrenergic receptor and rhodopsin). Below this primary (orthosteric) binding pocket lies a secondary (allosteric) binding pocket. The crystal-structure of A_{2A} bound to the antagonist ZM241385 (PDB code: 4EIY) showed that a sodium-ion can be found in this location of the protein, thus giving it the name 'sodium-ion binding pocket'.

=== Heteromers ===
The actions of the A_{2A} receptor are complicated by the fact that a variety of functional heteromers composed of a mixture of A_{2A} subunits with subunits from other unrelated G-protein coupled receptors have been found in the brain, adding a further degree of complexity to the role of adenosine in modulation of neuronal activity. Heteromers consisting of adenosine A_{1}/A_{2A}, dopamine D_{2}/A_{2A} and D_{3}/A_{2A}, glutamate mGluR_{5}/A_{2A} and cannabinoid CB_{1}/A_{2A} have all been observed, as well as CB_{1}/A_{2A}/D_{2} heterotrimers, and the functional significance and endogenous role of these hybrid receptors is still only starting to be unravelled.

The receptor's role in immunomodulation in the context of cancer has suggested that it is an important immune checkpoint molecule.

== Function ==
The gene encodes a protein which is one of several receptor subtypes for adenosine. The activity of the encoded protein, a G protein-coupled receptor family member, is mediated by G proteins which activate adenylyl cyclase, which induce synthesis of intracellular cAMP. The A_{2A} receptor binds with the G_{s} protein at the intracellular site of the receptor. The G_{s} protein consists of three subunits; G_{s}α, G_{s}β and G_{s}γ. A crystal structure of the A_{2A} receptor bound with the agonist NECA and a G protein-mimic has been published in 2016 (PDB code: 5g53).

The encoded protein (the A_{2A} receptor) is abundant in basal ganglia, vasculature, T lymphocytes, and platelets and it is a major target of caffeine, which is a competitive antagonist of this protein.

== Physiological role ==
A_{1} and A_{2A} receptors are believed to regulate myocardial oxygen demand and to increase coronary circulation by vasodilation. In addition, A_{2A} receptor can suppress immune cells, thereby protecting tissue from inflammation.

The A_{2A} receptor is also expressed in the brain, where it has important roles in the regulation of glutamate and dopamine release, making it a potential therapeutic target for the treatment of conditions such as insomnia, pain, depression, and Parkinson's disease.

== Ligands ==
A number of selective A_{2A} ligands have been developed, with several possible therapeutic applications.

Older research on adenosine receptor function, and non-selective adenosine receptor antagonists such as aminophylline, focused mainly on the role of adenosine receptors in the heart, and led to several randomized controlled trials using these receptor antagonists to treat bradyasystolic arrest.

However the development of more highly selective A_{2A} ligands has led towards other applications, with the most significant focus of research currently being the potential therapeutic role for A_{2A} antagonists in the treatment of Parkinson's disease.

=== Agonists ===
- Adenosine
- ATL-146e
- Binodenoson
- Cannabidiol
- CGS-21680
- DPMA (N6-(2-(3,5-dimethoxyphenyl)-2-(2-methylphenyl)ethyl)adenosine)
- Limonene
- LUF-5833
- NECA (5′-(N-ethylcarboxamido)adenosine)
- Regadenoson
- UK-432,097
- YT-146 (2-octynyladenosine)
- Zeatin riboside

=== Antagonists ===
- ATL-444
- Caffeine
- Istradefylline (KW-6002)
- Lu AA41063
- Lu AA47070
- MSX-2
- MSX-3
- Preladenant (SCH-420,814)
- MSX-3
- SCH-58261
- SCH-412,348
- SCH-442,416
- ST-1535
- Theophylline
- VER-6623
- VER-6947
- VER-7835
- Vipadenant (BIIB-014)
- ZM-241,385

=== Inverse agonists ===
- KW-6356

== Interactions ==
Adenosine A2A receptor has been shown to interact with Dopamine receptor D2. As a result, Adenosine receptor A2A decreases activity in the Dopamine D2 receptors.

== In cancer immunotherapy ==
The adenosine A2A receptor has also been shown to play a regulatory role in the adaptive immune system. In this role, it functions similarly to programmed cell death-1 (PD-1) and cytotoxic t-lymphocyte associated protein-4 (CTLA-4) receptors, namely to suppress immunologic response and prevent associated tissue damage. Extracellular adenosine gathers in response to cellular stress and breakdown through interactions with hypoxia induced HIF-1α. Abundant extracellular adenosine can then bind to the A2A receptor resulting in a G_{s}-protein coupled response, resulting in the accumulation of intracellular cAMP, which functions primarily through protein kinase A to upregulate inhibitory cytokines such as transforming growth factor-beta (TGF-β) and inhibitory receptors (i.e., PD-1). Interactions with FOXP3 stimulates CD4+ T-cells into regulatory T_{reg} cells further inhibiting immune response.

Blockade of A2AR has been attempted to various ends, namely cancer immunotherapy. While several A2A receptor antagonists have progressed to clinical trials for the treatment of Parkinson's disease, A2AR blockade in the context of cancer is less characterized. Mice treated with A2AR antagonists, such as ZM241385 (listed above) or caffeine, show significantly delayed tumor growth due to T-cells resistant to inhibition. This is further highlighted by A2AR knockout mice who show increased tumor rejection. Multiple checkpoint pathway inhibition has been shown to have an additive effect, as shown by an increase in response with blockade to PD-1 and CTLA-4 via monoclonal antibodies as compared to the blockade of a single pathway. The A2AR antogonist CPI-444 has shown this in combination with anti-PD-L1 or anti-CTLA-4 treatment as it eliminated tumors in up to 90% of treated mice, including restoration of immune responses in models that incompletely responded to anti-PD-L1 or anti-CTLA-4 monotherapy. Further, tumor growth was fully inhibited when mice with cleared tumors were later rechallenged, indicating that CPI-444 induced systemic antitumor immune memory. Researchers believe that A2AR blockade could increase the efficacy of such treatments even further. Finally, inhibition of A2AR, either through pharmacologic or genetic targeting, in chimeric antigen receptor (CAR) T-cells reveals promising results. Blockade of A2AR in this setting has shown to increase tumor clearance through CAR T-cell therapy in mice. Targeting of the A2A receptor is an attractive option for the treatment of a variety of cancers, especially with the therapeutic success of the blockade of other checkpoint pathways such as PD-1 and CTLA-4.
