= Adenosine receptor antagonist =

Class of drugs

An adenosine receptor antagonist is a drug which acts as an antagonist of one or more of the adenosine receptors. The best known drugs of this class include xanthine and its derivatives (natural: caffeine, theophylline, and theobromine; and synthetic: PSB-1901), but there are also non-xanthine representatives (e.g. ISAM-140, ISAM-R316, etrumadenant, and AZD-4635)

== See also ==
- Adenosine receptor agonist
- Adenosine reuptake inhibitor
