= 8-Bromotheophylline =

Chemical compound

Clinical data
- Other names: Bromotheophylline

Identifiers
- IUPAC name: 8-Bromo-1,3-dimethyl-7H-purine-2,6-dione
- CAS Number: 10381-75-6
- PubChem CID: 11808
- DrugBank: DB14018
- ChemSpider: 11315
- UNII: FZG87K1MQ6
- ChEMBL: ChEMBL316160
- CompTox Dashboard (EPA): DTXSID7044768
- ECHA InfoCard: 100.030.757

Chemical and physical data
- Formula: C_{7}H_{7}BrN_{4}O_{2}
- Molar mass: 259.063 g·mol^{−1}
- 3D model (JSmol): Interactive image
- SMILES: CN1C2=C(C(=O)N(C1=O)C)NC(=N2)Br
- InChI: InChI=1S/C7H7BrN4O2/c1-11-4-3(9-6(8)10-4)5(13)12(2)7(11)14/h1-2H3,(H,9,10); Key:SKTFQHRVFFOHTQ-UHFFFAOYSA-N

8-Bromotheophylline is a diuretic drug of the xanthine class. It is the main active ingredient in pamabrom where it is sold as an over-the-counter medication in combination with paracetamol, among other analgesics, to treat dysmenorrhea. It is also an adenosine receptor A_{1} antagonist.

== See also ==
- 8-Chlorotheophylline
- 8-Cyclopentyltheophylline
- 8-Phenyltheophylline
