= 8-Phenyltheophylline =

Chemical compound

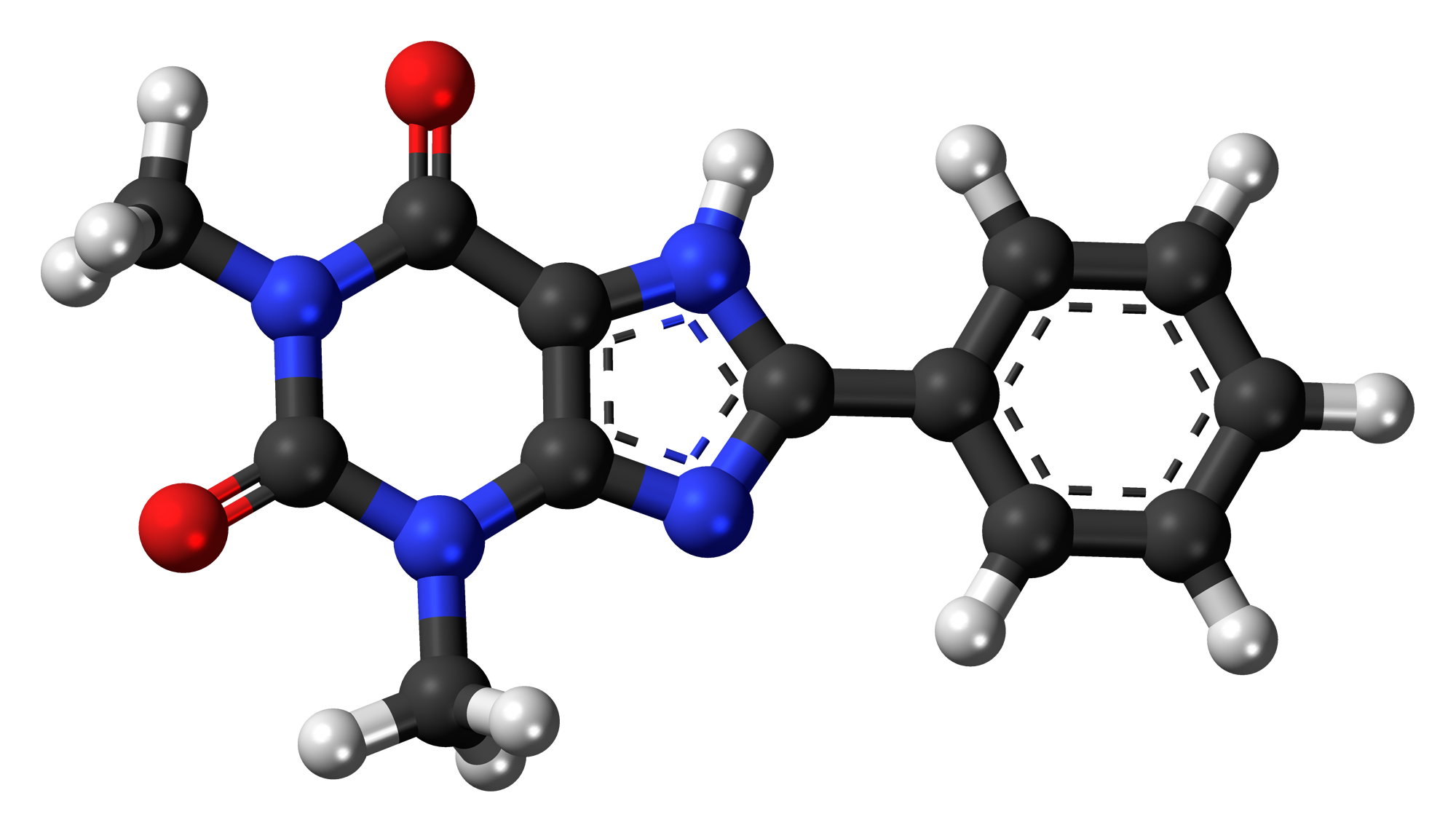

Clinical data
- ATC code: None

Identifiers
- IUPAC name: 8-Phenyl-1,3-dimethyl-7H-purine-2,6-dione
- CAS Number: 961-45-5
- PubChem CID: 1922
- ChemSpider: 1846
- UNII: E6M543P3BL
- ChEMBL: ChEMBL62350
- CompTox Dashboard (EPA): DTXSID90242119

Chemical and physical data
- Formula: C_{13}H_{12}N_{4}O_{2}
- Molar mass: 256.265 g·mol^{−1}
- 3D model (JSmol): Interactive image
- SMILES: Cn3c(=O)c2nc(c1ccccc1)[nH]c2n(C)c3=O
- InChI: InChI=1S/C13H12N4O2/c1-16-11-9(12(18)17(2)13(16)19)14-10(15-11)8-6-4-3-5-7-8/h3-7H,1-2H3,(H,14,15); Key:PJFMAVHETLRJHJ-UHFFFAOYSA-N

8-Phenyltheophylline (8-phenyl-1,3-dimethylxanthine, 8-PT) is a drug derived from the xanthine family which acts as a potent and selective antagonist for the adenosine receptors A_{1} and A_{2A}, but unlike other xanthine derivatives has virtually no activity as a phosphodiesterase inhibitor. It has stimulant effects in animals with similar potency to caffeine. Coincidentally 8-phenyltheophylline has also been found to be a potent and selective inhibitor of the liver enzyme CYP1A2 which makes it likely to cause interactions with other drugs which are normally metabolised by CYP1A2.

== See also ==
- 8-Chlorotheophylline
- 8-Cyclopentyltheophylline
- DPCPX
- DMPX
- Xanthine
