= Midol =

Brand of analgesics for menstrual cramping

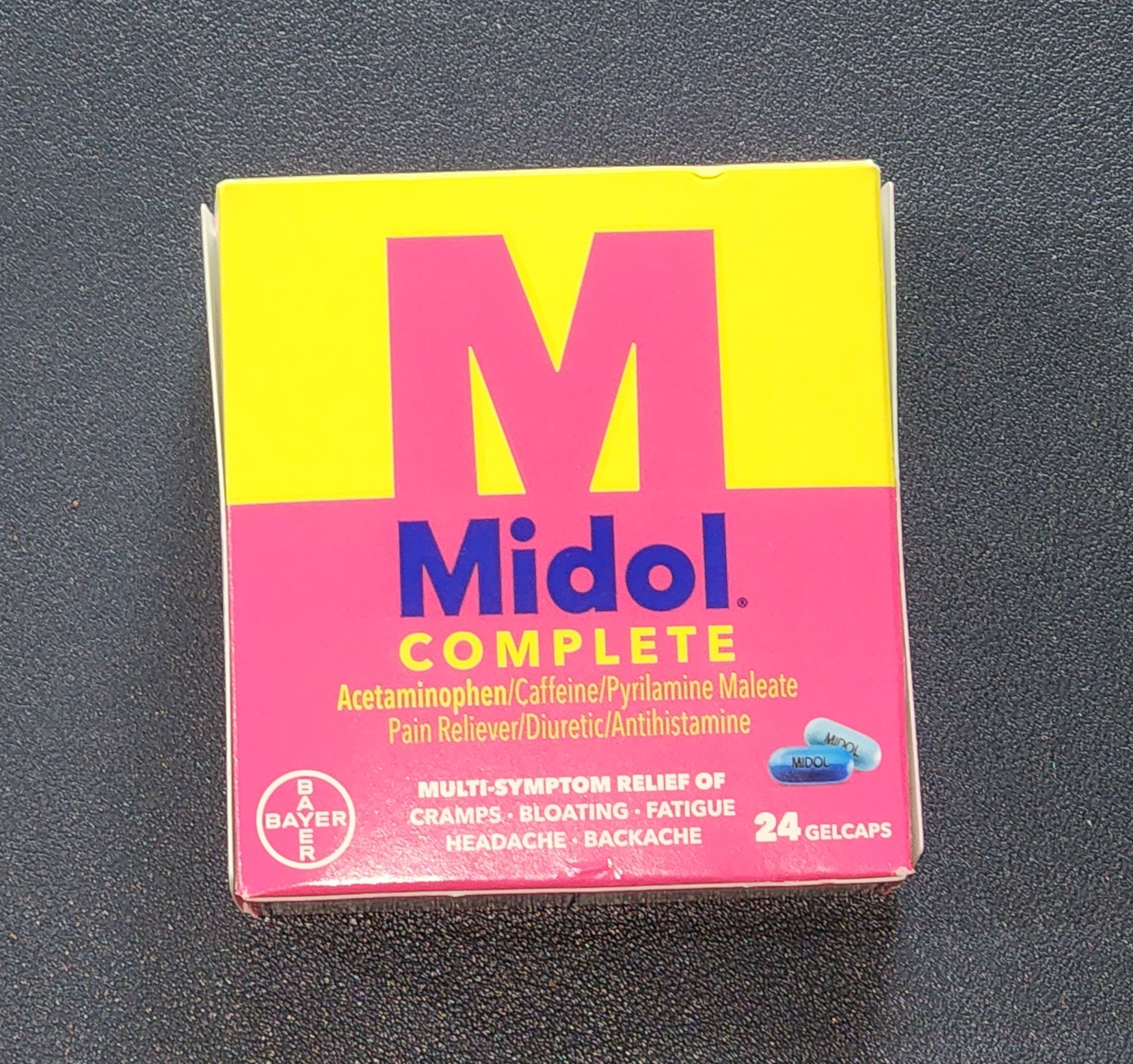
Box of Midol, 2023

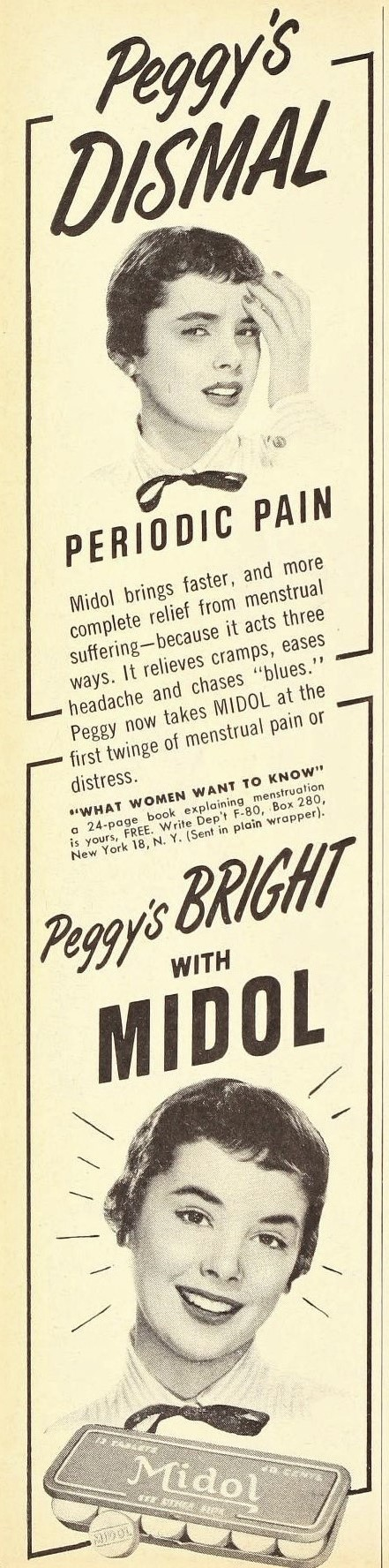
Midol advertisement, 1960

Midol is a brand of over-the-counter analgesic drugs marketed for menstrual cramping and other effects related to premenstrual syndrome and menstruation. Various subbrands are formulated using different active ingredients. Midol is distributed by Bayer.

Midol was originally sold in 1911 as a headache and toothache remedy that was considered safer because it did not use the narcotics typically used at the time. It was then promoted as a cure for hiccups claiming it controlled spasms, and finally as a remedy for menstrual cramps and bloating. A formulation sold in the 1980s was made with the sympathomimetic cinnamedrine. It had been reported to have abuse potential as an appetite suppressant and sympathomimetic agent. Midol, like other NSAID class of drugs, may have side effects for some, such as an increased risk of bleeding, kidney damage or negative effects on cardiovascular system.

In 2020 GoDutch and Oliver Agency redesigned Midol's packaging and brand image. To promote the redesign, Midol was promoted through Refinery29 and Snapchat, aiming to reach Gen Z customers.

The "Midol Complete" formulation consists of:

- Acetaminophen 500 mg (pain reliever)
- Caffeine 60 mg (stimulant)
- Pyrilamine maleate 15 mg (antihistamine)

The "Extended Relief" formulation consists of:

- Naproxen sodium 220 mg (NSAID, pain reliever/fever reducer)

The "Teen" formulation consists of:

- Acetaminophen 500 mg (pain reliever)
- Pamabrom 25 mg (diuretic)

The "Liquid Gels" (Labeled MAXIDOL) formulation consists of:

- Ibuprofen 200 mg (NSAID, pain reliever)

The "PM" formulation consists of:

- Acetaminophen 500 mg (pain reliever)
- Diphenhydramine citrate 38 mg (sedative antihistamine)
