= Theal =

Theal may refer to

- George McCall Theal (1837-1919), South African historian
- Theal (film), a 2021 Indian film
- Dyphylline
