= Guanine deaminase =

Mammalian protein found in Homo sapiens

GDA

Identifiers
- Aliases: GDA, guanine deaminase, CYPIN, GUANASE, NEDASIN, Guanine deaminase, GAH
- External IDs: OMIM: 139260; MGI: 95678; GeneCards: GDA
Available structures
PDB	Ortholog search: PDBe RCSB
PDB	List of PDB id codes 4AQL, 3E0L, 2UZ9
Enzyme activity
EC #	BRENDA	ExPASy	KEGG	MetaCyc
3.5.4.3	↗	↗	↗	↗

Gene location (Human)
Chr.	Chromosome 9 (human)
Band	9q21.13	Start	72,114,595 bp
Band	9q21.13	End	72,257,193 bp

Gene location (Mouse)
Chr.	Chromosome 19 (mouse)
Band	19 B|19 14.32 cM	Start	21,368,671 bp
Band	19 B|19 14.32 cM	End	21,450,809 bp
RNA expression pattern
Bgee	Human / Mouse (ortholog); Top expressed in: mucosa of ileum; jejunal mucosa; pancreatic ductal cell; endothelial cell; Brodmann area 46; Brodmann area 23; middle temporal gyrus; entorhinal cortex; superior frontal gyrus; parietal lobe / Top expressed in: epithelium of small intestine; ventromedial nucleus; granulocyte; subiculum; olfactory tubercle; anterior amygdaloid area; conjunctival fornix; nucleus accumbens; piriform cortex; lateral septal nucleus; More reference expression data
BioGPS	n/a
Gene ontology
Molecular function	hydrolase activity; metal ion binding; hydrolase activity, acting on carbon-nitrogen (but not peptide) bonds; zinc ion binding; guanine deaminase activity; protein binding
Cellular component	cytosol; intracellular anatomical structure
Biological process	guanine catabolic process; purine nucleotide catabolic process; nucleobase-containing compound metabolic process; nervous system development; guanine metabolic process
Sources:Amigo / QuickGO
Orthologs
Databases	NCBI: entry; OMA: entry
Species	Human	Mouse
Entrez	9615	14544
Ensembl	ENSG00000119125	ENSMUSG00000058624
UniProt	Q9Y2T3	Q9R111
RefSeq (mRNA)	NM_001242505; NM_001242506; NM_001242507; NM_004293; NM_001351571 NM_001351572; NM_001351573	NM_010266
RefSeq (protein)	NP_001229434; NP_001229435; NP_001229436; NP_004284; NP_001338500 NP_001338501; NP_001338502	NP_034396
Location (UCSC)	Chr 9: 72.11 – 72.26 Mb	Chr 19: 21.37 – 21.45 Mb
PubMed search
- Wikidata
View/Edit Human	View/Edit Mouse

Guanine deaminase also known as cypin, guanase, guanine aminase, GAH, and guanine aminohydrolase is an aminohydrolase enzyme first characterised from Girella nigricans which converts the nucleotide base, guanine, to xanthine and ammonia.

guanine
H_{2}O
NH_{3}
xanthine

The aminohydrolase family of enzymes includes over 100,000 members and most have a TIM barrel fold. Cypin is found in all organisms as part of purine metabolism and uses a zinc cation to activate water for the hydrolysis. it is a major cytosolic protein that interacts with PSD-95. It promotes localized microtubule assembly in neuronal dendrites.
