= 8-Cyclopentyl-1,3-dimethylxanthine =

Chemical compound

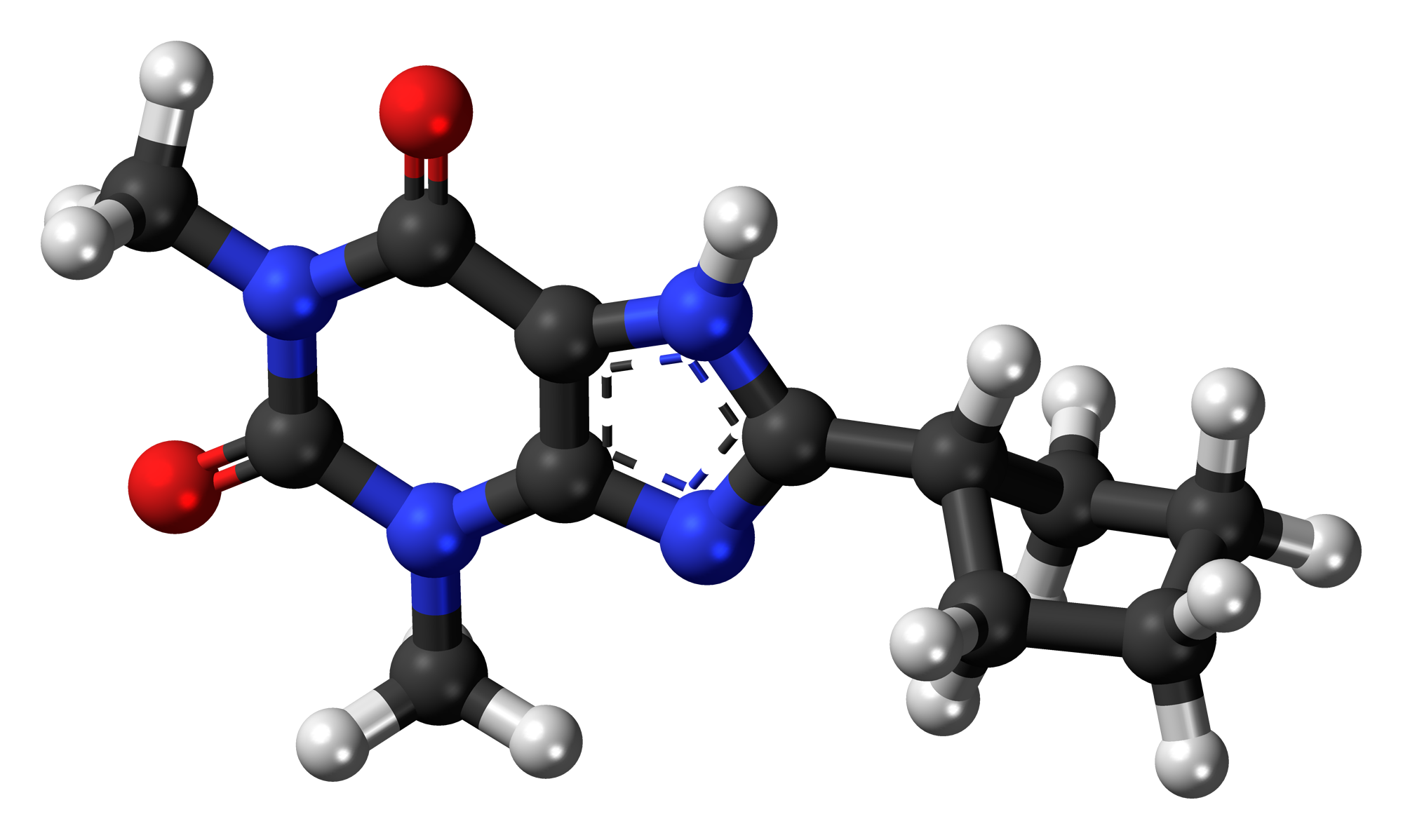

Clinical data
- ATC code: None

Legal status
- Legal status: In general: uncontrolled

Identifiers
- IUPAC name: 8-Cyclopentyl-1,3-dimethyl-7H-purine-2,6-dione
- CAS Number: 35873-49-5
- PubChem CID: 1917
- IUPHAR/BPS: 385
- ChemSpider: 1843
- UNII: U7PWT4CPL5
- ChEBI: CHEBI:109538
- ChEMBL: ChEMBL106265
- CompTox Dashboard (EPA): DTXSID70189432

Chemical and physical data
- Formula: C_{12}H_{16}N_{4}O_{2}
- Molar mass: 248.286 g·mol^{−1}
- 3D model (JSmol): Interactive image
- SMILES: Cn3c(=O)c2nc(C1CCCC1)[nH]c2n(C)c3=O
- InChI: InChI=1S/C12H16N4O2/c1-15-10-8(11(17)16(2)12(15)18)13-9(14-10)7-5-3-4-6-7/h7H,3-6H2,1-2H3,(H,13,14); Key:SCVHFRLUNIOSGI-UHFFFAOYSA-N

8-Cyclopentyl-1,3-dimethylxanthine (8-Cyclopentyltheophylline, 8-CPT, CPX) is a drug which acts as a potent and selective antagonist for the adenosine receptors, with some selectivity for the A_{1} receptor subtype, as well as a non-selective phosphodiesterase inhibitor. It has stimulant effects in animals with slightly higher potency than caffeine.

== See also ==
- 8-Chlorotheophylline
- 8-Phenyltheophylline
- DMPX
- DPCPX
- Xanthine
