= Thomas Vles =

Dutch business executive (born 1985)

- Born: 1985 (age 40–41); Amsterdam
- Citizenship: Netherlands
- Education: University of Amsterdam, Vrije Universiteit Amsterdam
- Occupations: Entrepreneur, business executive
- Organization: GoDutch
- Known for: Founder of business banking provider GoDutch

Thomas Vles is a Dutch entrepreneur associated with the financial technology sector. He is the founder of GoDutch, a company focused on providing business banking services for small and medium-sized enterprises (SMEs) in Europe.

== Early life and education ==
Vles studied physics and astrophysics at the University of Amsterdam. He later obtained two Master of Science degrees from Vrije Universiteit Amsterdam in Clinical Epidemiology and Occupational Psychology. He has also been involved in academic activities as a guest lecturer at the University of Amsterdam.

== Career ==
Vles began his career in entrepreneurship by founding Poopy Cat, a consumer products company that expanded internationally prior to its acquisition. He later founded BlueBottle Ventures, through which he has been involved in supporting early-stage companies across multiple sectors. He subsequently moved into the financial technology industry, where he was chief executive officer of Tellow, a financial administration platform originally developed within Rabobank. During his tenure, the company was acquired by the Danish firm Ageras Group, where he subsequently held a commercial leadership role.

Following the acquisition of Tellow by Ageras, he continued in a senior role within the organization. He later was Chief Revenue Officer at Shine (formerly Ageras), where his responsibilities included commercial strategy, revenue development, and international expansion. Shine was later acquired by Cegid.

In 2024, Vles founded GoDutch, a financial technology company focused on business banking solutions for SMEs. The company provides digital business accounts and financial tools designed to support entrepreneurs in managing payments, administration, and financial operations across European markets.

== Recognition ==
Vles has received recognition for his contributions to entrepreneurship and financial technology. He has been named a Deloitte Rising Star, was a winner in the Mastercard fintech category, and has been nominated for MT/Sprout Startup of the Year.
