= Dimenhydrinate =

Anti-emetic and antihistamine medication

Combination of
- Diphenhydramine: Antihistamine, sedative
- 8-Chlorotheophylline: Stimulant

Clinical data
- Trade names: Dramamine, Draminate, Gravol, others
- Other names: Diphenhydramine/8-chlorotheophylline salt
- AHFS/Drugs.com: Monograph
- MedlinePlus: a607046
- License data: US DailyMed: Dimenhydrinate
- Pregnancy category: AU: A
- Routes of administration: By mouth, rectal, intravascular, intramuscular
- ATC code: R06AA11 (WHO) combinations R06AA61 (WHO)

Legal status
- Legal status: AU: S2 (Pharmacy medicine); CA: OTC; US: OTC; SE: OTC

Pharmacokinetic data
- Metabolism: Liver
- Elimination half-life: 5.5 hours (diphenhydramine component)

Identifiers
- CAS Number: 523-87-5
- PubChem CID: 10660
- DrugBank: DB00985
- ChemSpider: 10210
- UNII: JB937PER5C
- KEGG: D00520
- ChEBI: CHEBI:94848
- ChEMBL: ChEMBL1200406
- CompTox Dashboard (EPA): DTXSID9025087
- ECHA InfoCard: 100.007.593

Dimenhydrinate, also known as diphenhydramine/8-chlorotheophylline salt and sold under the brand names Dramamine and Gravol, among others, is an over-the-counter medication used to treat motion sickness and nausea. Dimenhydrinate is a theoclate salt composed of diphenhydramine and 8-chlorotheophylline (a theophylline relative) in a 1:1 ratio.

Dimenhydrinate was introduced to the market by G.D. Searle in 1949.

== Medical uses ==
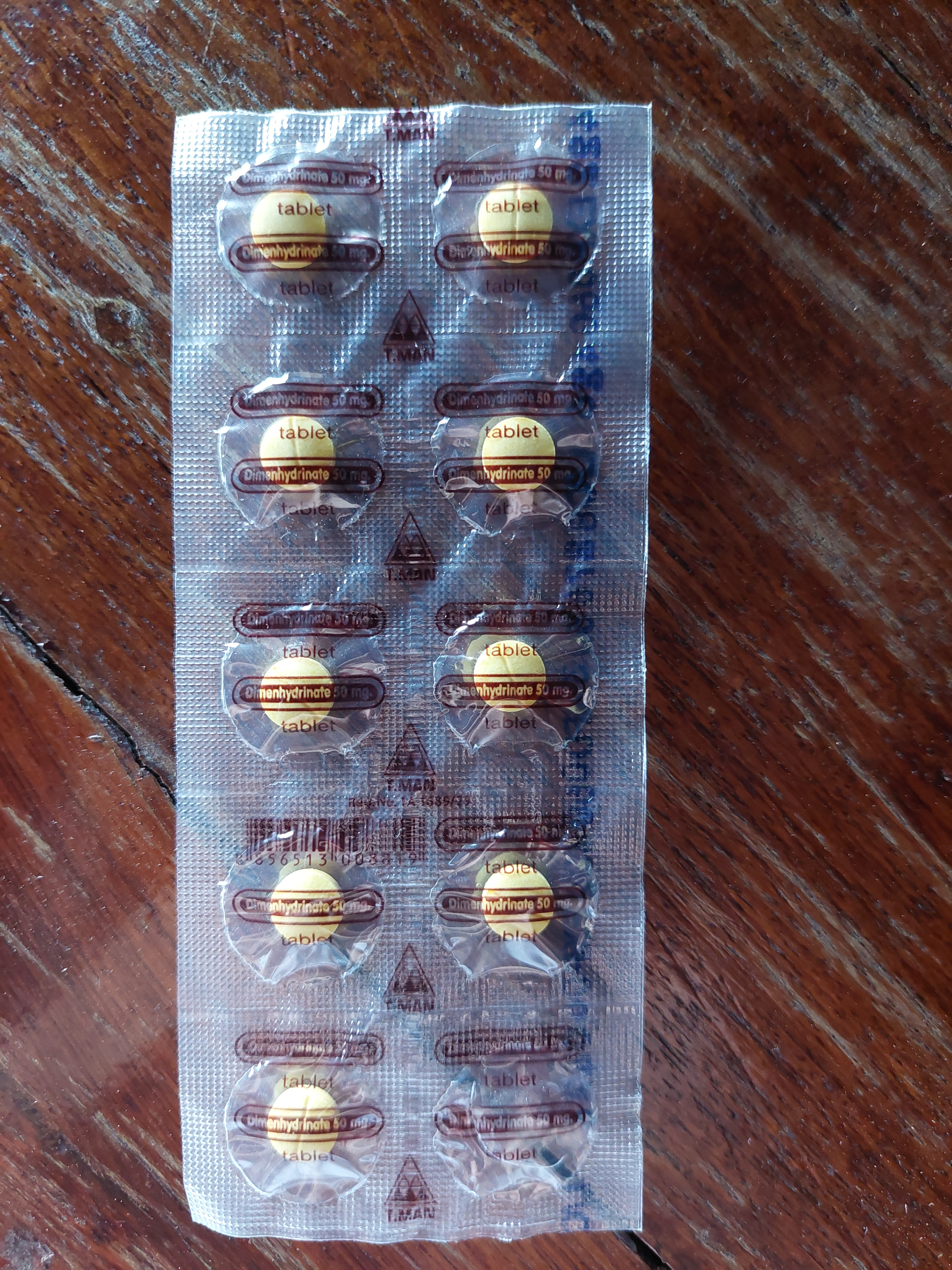
Pills sold in Phnom Penh over the counter

Dimenhydrinate is an over-the-counter (OTC) first-generation antihistamine indicated for the prevention and relief of nausea and vomiting from a number of causes, including motion-sickness and post-operative nausea.

== Side effects ==
Common side effects of dimenhydrinate may include drowsiness, dry mouth, nose, or throat, constipation, and blurred vision. Some individuals, particularly children, may experience feelings of restlessness or excitement. In certain cases, more severe symptoms may arise, such as delirium, weakness, and a tendency to be easily startled. Hallucinations, psychosis, and an unusual sensitivity to sudden sounds have also been reported. Continuous or cumulative use of anticholinergic medications, including first-generation antihistamines, is associated with higher risk of cognitive decline and dementia in older people. However, in younger people this is not relevant.

== Pharmacology ==
=== Pharmacodynamics ===
Diphenhydramine is the primary constituent of dimenhydrinate and dictates the primary effect. The main differences relative to pure diphenhydramine are a lower potency due to being combined with 8-chlorotheophylline (by weight, dimenhydrinate is between 53% and 55.5% diphenhydramine) and the fact that the stimulant properties of 8-chlorotheophylline help reduce the side effect of drowsiness brought on by diphenhydramine. Diphenhydramine is itself an H_{1} receptor antagonist that demonstrates anticholinergic activity.

=== Pharmacokinetics ===
The diphenhydramine component requires about 2 hours to reach peak concentration after either oral or sublingual administration of dimenhydrinate, and has a half-life of 5 – 6 hours in healthy adults.

== Recreational use ==
Dimenhydrinate is recreationally used as a deliriant. Slang terms for Dramamine used this way include "drama", "dime", "dime tabs", "D-Q", "substance D", "d-house", and "drams". Abusing Dramamine is sometimes referred to as Dramatizing or "going a dime a dozen", a reference to the number of Dramamine tablets generally necessary for a recreational dose.

Many users report a side-effect profile consistent with tropane alkaloid (e.g., atropine) poisoning as both show antagonism of muscarinic acetylcholine receptors in both the central and autonomic nervous system, which inhibits various signal transduction pathways.

Other CNS effects occur within the limbic system and hippocampus, causing confusion and temporary amnesia due to decreased acetylcholine signaling. Toxicity manifests in the autonomic nervous system, primarily at the neuromuscular junction, resulting in ataxia and extrapyramidal side effects and the feeling of heaviness in the legs, and at sympathetic post-ganglionic junctions, causing urinary retention, pupil dilation, tachycardia, irregular urination, and dry red skin caused by decreased exocrine gland secretions, and mucous membranes. Considerable overdosage can lead to myocardial infarction (heart attack), serious ventricular arrhythmias, coma, and death. Such a side-effect profile is thought to give ethanolamine-class antihistamines a relatively low abuse liability. An antidote that can be used for dimenhydrinate poisoning is physostigmine.

== History ==
Dimenhydrinate (originally known as Compound 1694) was being tested as a potential treatment for hay fever and hives at Johns Hopkins Hospital in 1947 by allergists Dr. Leslie Gay and Dr. Paul Carliner. Among those who received the drug was a pregnant woman who had suffered from motion sickness her entire life. She remained symptom-free if she took dimenhydrinate a few minutes before boarding a trolley, whereas the placebo was ineffective. To confirm these findings, the following year, G.D. Searle & Co. conducted a trial in which dimenhydrinate or placebo was given to U.S. troops crossing the Atlantic during "a rough passage" in a converted freight ship, the General Ballou, for ten days as a rescue therapy for sea sickness. The findings were positive, as were the findings of a second trial of mostly women on the ship's return voyage. Gay and Carliner announced their discovery at a meeting of the Johns Hopkins Medical Society on February 14, 1949, as well as in the Bulletin of The Johns Hopkins Hospital. The New York Times, the Baltimore Sun, and other national newspapers covered the discovery, and Dramamine was made available in drugstores later that year.

== Brand names ==
Dimenhydrinate tends to be globally available and as such is marketed under different brands names. Sometimes it also appears as part of a formulation like the Australian TRAVACALM ORIGINAL where 50 mg dimenhydrinate are combined with 20 mg caffeine and 0.2mg (200 micrograms) hysoscine hydrobromide.

Brand name	Countries
Anautin	Ecuador
Antimo	Indonesia
Aviomarin	Poland, Slovakia (formerly)
Biodramina	Spain
Cinfamar	Spain, Peru, Taiwan
Daedalon	Hungary
Dimigal	Serbia
Dizinil	United Arab Emirates, Gulf regions
Dramamine	U.S, Argentina, Mexico, Turkey, Thailand
Dramenex	Egypt
Dramin	Brazil
Dramina	Russia, Croatia
Driminate	Ukraine
Enjomin	Portugal
Gravamin	Iceland
Gravicoll	Peru
Gravinate	Pakistan
Gravol	Canada, Costa Rica, India
Mareol	Colombia
Travacalm	Australia
Travamin	Israel
Valontan	Italy
Vertirosan	Austria, Latvia
Viabom	Portugal
Vomex	South Africa, Germany
Vomidrine	Portugal
Xamamina	Italy

== Popular culture ==
Modest Mouse produced a song titled "Dramamine" on their 1996 debut album This Is a Long Drive for Someone with Nothing to Think About. The song uses side effects of the drug as a metaphor for the deteriorating state of a personal relationship.

"The Ending of Dramamine" is the opening track of the album How to Leave Town by Car Seat Headrest.

Wallice's 2021 EP Off the Rails has a track titled "Dramamine" utilizing the motion sickness drug as a metaphor for navigating an emotionally taxing relationship.
