= Dipropylcyclopentylxanthine =

Chemical compound

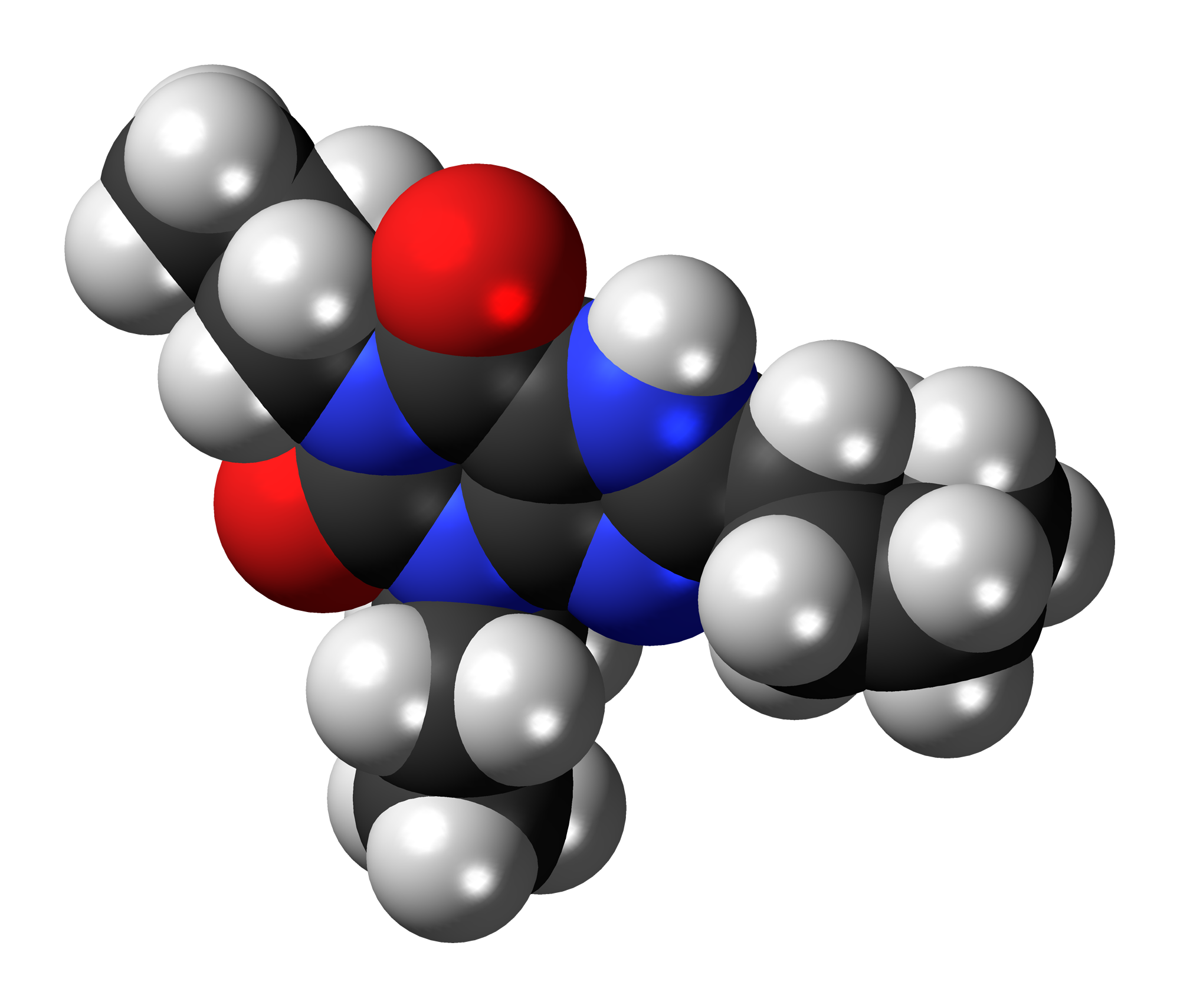

Clinical data
- ATC code: None

Legal status
- Legal status: In general: uncontrolled

Identifiers
- IUPAC name: 8-cyclopentyl-1,3-dipropyl-7H-purine-2,6-dione
- CAS Number: 102146-07-6
- PubChem CID: 1329
- IUPHAR/BPS: 386
- ChemSpider: 1289
- UNII: 9PTP4FOI9E
- ChEBI: CHEBI:73282
- ChEMBL: ChEMBL183
- CompTox Dashboard (EPA): DTXSID50144706
- ECHA InfoCard: 100.162.425

Chemical and physical data
- Formula: C_{16}H_{24}N_{4}O_{2}
- Molar mass: 304.394 g·mol^{−1}
- 3D model (JSmol): Interactive image
- Melting point: 191 to 194 °C (376 to 381 °F)
- SMILES: CCCn3c(=O)c2nc(C1CCCC1)[nH]c2n(CCC)c3=O
- InChI: InChI=1S/C16H24N4O2/c1-3-9-19-14-12(15(21)20(10-4-2)16(19)22)17-13(18-14)11-7-5-6-8-11/h11H,3-10H2,1-2H3,(H,17,18); Key:FFBDFADSZUINTG-UHFFFAOYSA-N

8-Cyclopentyl-1,3-dipropylxanthine (DPCPX, PD-116,948) is a drug which acts as a potent and selective antagonist for the adenosine A_{1} receptor. It has high selectivity for A_{1} over other adenosine receptor subtypes, but as with other xanthine derivatives DPCPX also acts as a phosphodiesterase inhibitor, and is almost as potent as rolipram at inhibiting PDE4. It has been used to study the function of the adenosine A_{1} receptor in animals, which has been found to be involved in several important functions such as regulation of breathing and activity in various regions of the brain, and DPCPX has also been shown to produce behavioural effects such as increasing the hallucinogen-appropriate responding produced by the 5-HT_{2A} agonist DOI, and the dopamine release induced by MDMA, as well as having interactions with a range of anticonvulsant drugs.

== See also ==
- DMPX
- CPX
- Xanthine
