= 8-Bromocaffeine =

Derivative of caffeine

Names
- IUPAC name 8-bromo-1,3,7-trimethylpurine-2,6-dione
- Other names: Xanthobine; Xanthobin; 8-Caffeine bromide

Identifiers
| CAS Number | 10381-82-5 |
| 3D model (JSmol) | Interactive image |
| ChEMBL | ChEMBL91786 |
| ChemSpider | 57703 |
| PubChem CID | 64127 |
| CompTox Dashboard (EPA) | DTXSID10146069 |
- InChI: InChI=1S/C8H9BrN4O2/c1-11-4-5(10-7(11)9)12(2)8(15)13(3)6(4)14/h1-3H3 Key: YRLRORFORQUTKS-UHFFFAOYSA-N
- SMILES: CN1C2=C(N=C1Br)N(C(=O)N(C2=O)C)C

Properties
| Chemical formula | C_{8}H_{9}BrN_{4}O_{2} |
| Molar mass | 273.090 g·mol^{−1} |
| Appearance | White solid |
| Melting point | 206 °C (403 °F; 479 K) |

Hazards
- GHS labelling
| Pictograms | (GHS07: Exclamation mark) |
| Signal word | Warning |
| Hazard statements | H302 |
| Precautionary statements | P264, P270, P301+P317, P330, P501 |
- Except where otherwise noted, data are given for materials in their standard state (at 25 °C [77 °F], 100 kPa). Infobox references

8-Bromocaffeine is a derivative of caffeine (a xanthine class), which is used as a radiosensitizer in the radiotherapy of tumors to increase the sensitivity of tumor cells to radiation treatment.

== Synthesis ==
8-Bromocaffeine is produced in an electrophilic aromatic substitution by direct bromination with bromine in glacial acetic acid. Added sodium acetate acts as an acid scavenger for the hydrogen bromide that is formed. The elemental bromine can also be prepared in situ by oxidizing sodium bromide in an aqueous caffeine solution with hydrogen peroxide. Yields of 85% have been reported.

== Properties ==
The caffeine derivative is a white and odorless solid with a melting point of 206 °C.

== Uses ==
The substance acts as a radiomodulator, especially as a radiosensitizer In the radiotherapy of brain tumors, an increased sensitivity of the tumor cells, induced by 8-bromocaffeine, was observed.
