= George Rieveschl =

American chemist and professor (1916–2007)

- Born: January 9, 1916; Lockland, Ohio, U.S.
- Died: September 27, 2007 (aged 91); Cincinnati, Ohio, U.S.
- Education: University of Cincinnati
- Occupation: Chemical Engineer
- Known for: Inventing the popular antihistamine diphenhydramine
- Spouse: Ellen
- Children: 2

George Rieveschl (January 9, 1916 – September 27, 2007) was an American chemist and professor. He was the inventor of the popular antihistamine diphenhydramine (Benadryl), which he first made while searching for potential muscle relaxant drugs.

== Early life and education ==
Born in Arlington Heights, Ohio, Rieveschl was the son of George and Alma Hoffling Rieveschl. He initially attended the Ohio Mechanics Institute, graduating in 1933, before earning bachelors, masters, and PhD degrees in chemistry at the University of Cincinnati (UC).

== Career ==
After receiving his PhD in 1940, Rieveschl returned to the University of Cincinnati where he served as a professor of chemical engineering, and later a professor of materials science. At the university, he led a research program searching for potential muscle relaxant drugs. In 1943, one of his students, Fred Huber, synthesized diphenhydramine. Rieveschl worked with Parke-Davis to test the compound, and the company licensed the patent from him. In 1947 Parke-Davis hired him as their director of research. While he was there, he led the development of a similar drug, orphenadrine.

Rieveschl remained active in the Cincinnati-area science and arts community until his death at age 91 from pneumonia. He had contributed an estimated $10 million to his alma mater, according to a UC spokeswoman.

The main life sciences building on the campus of the University of Cincinnati is named for Rieveschl.
