= DMPX =

Chemical compound

Clinical data
- ATC code: None

Identifiers
- IUPAC name: 3,7-Dimethyl-1-(2-propyn-1-yl)-3,7-dihydro-1H-purine-2,6-dione
- CAS Number: 14114-46-6
- PubChem CID: 99562
- ChemSpider: 89948
- UNII: 5YFR5SPS6T
- CompTox Dashboard (EPA): DTXSID30161577
- ECHA InfoCard: 100.162.258

Chemical and physical data
- Formula: C_{10}H_{10}N_{4}O_{2}
- Molar mass: 218.216 g·mol^{−1}
- 3D model (JSmol): Interactive image
- SMILES: Cn2cnc(c2c1=O)n(C)c(=O)n1CC#C
- InChI: InChI=1S/C10H10N4O2/c1-4-5-14-9(15)7-8(11-6-12(7)2)13(3)10(14)16/h1,6H,5H2,2-3H3; Key:IORPOFJLSIHJOG-UHFFFAOYSA-N

DMPX (3,7-dimethyl-1-propargylxanthine) is a caffeine analog which displays affinity for A_{2} adenosine receptors, in contrast to the A_{1} subtype receptors. DMPX had 28 times and 15 times higher potency than caffeine in blocking, respectively, the peripheral and central effects of the adenosine agonist NECA. The locomotor stimulation caused by DMPX (ED_{50} 10 μmol/kg) was similarly higher than caffeine.

== See also ==
- DPCPX
- 8-PT
- CPX (8-CPT)
- 8-Chlorotheophylline
- Theophylline
