= Theobromine poisoning =

Overdose reaction to the xanthine alkaloid theobromine

- Other names: Chocolate poisoning, cocoa poisoning
- Structure of theobromine (IUPAC name: 3,7-dimethyl-1H-purine-2,6-dione)
- Specialty: Toxicology

Theobromine poisoning is an overdosage reaction to the xanthine alkaloid theobromine, found in coffee, chocolate, tea, cola beverages, and some other foods.

== Signs and symptoms ==
Mild-to-moderate symptoms include sweating, trembling and severe headaches. These occur at theobromine doses of 0.8–1.5 g per day, such as may be found in 50–100 g (1.8–3.5 oz) of cocoa powder.

Severe symptoms include cardiac arrhythmias, epileptic seizures, internal bleeding, heart attacks, and possibly death.

== Sources ==
Oral toxicity (mg/kg)
Oral toxicity (mg/kg)	TD_{Lo}	LD_{50}
Cat		200
Dog	16	300
Human	26	~800
Rodent		837
Rabbit		1,000
Rat		1,265

Cocoa powder contains about 2.1% theobromine by weight, so 14 g (0.5 oz) of raw cocoa contains approximately 0.3 g theobromine.

Processed chocolate, in general, has smaller amounts. The amount found in highly refined chocolate candies or sweets (typically 1.4–2.1 g/kg or 40–60 mg/oz) is much lower than that of dark chocolate or unsweetened baking chocolate (>14 g/kg or >400 mg/oz).

In general, the amount of theobromine found in chocolate is small enough that chocolate can be safely consumed by humans with a negligible risk of poisoning.

== Pharmacology ==
Theobromine has a biological half-life of 10 hours, with 16%–18% unmodified 48 h after a single dose of 10 mg/kg (0.00016 oz/lb).

== Other animals ==
=== Toxicity ===
The median lethal dose (LD_{50}) of theobromine has only been published for cats, dogs, rats, and mice; these differ by a factor of 6 across species.

Serious poisoning happens more frequently in animals, which metabolize theobromine much more slowly than humans, and can easily consume enough chocolate to cause poisoning. The most common victims of theobromine poisoning are dogs, for whom it can be fatal. The toxic dose for cats is even lower than for dogs. However, cats are less prone to eating chocolate since they are unable to taste sweetness. Theobromine is less toxic to rats and mice, who all have an LD_{50} of about 1,000 mg/kg (0.016 oz/lb).

In dogs, the biological half-life of theobromine is 17.5 hours; in severe cases, clinical symptoms of theobromine poisoning can persist for 72 hours. Medical treatment performed by a veterinarian involves inducing vomiting within two hours of ingestion and administration of benzodiazepines or barbiturates for seizures, antiarrhythmics for heart arrhythmias, and fluid diuresis. Theobromine is also suspected to induce right atrial cardiomyopathy after long term exposure at levels equivalent to approximately 15 g/kg (0.24 oz/lb) of dark chocolate per day. According to the Merck Veterinary Manual, baker's chocolate of approximately 1.3 g/kg (0.021 oz/lb) of a dog's body weight is sufficient to cause symptoms of toxicity. For example, 0.4 oz (11 g) of baker's chocolate would be enough to produce mild symptoms in a 20 lb (9.1 kg) dog, while a 25% cacao chocolate bar (like milk chocolate) would be only 25% as toxic as the same dose of baker's chocolate. One ounce of milk chocolate per pound of body weight (63 g/kg) is a potentially lethal dose in dogs.

In a UK study of veterinary clinical records, canine chocolate exposure was more commonly recorded around Christmas and Easter than outside holiday periods. Potential sources of chocolate exposure during the festive season include chocolate Christmas tree decorations and advent calendars, as well as hot chocolate drinks.

=== Wildlife ===
In 2014, four American black bears were found dead at a bait site in New Hampshire. A necropsy and toxicology report performed at the University of New Hampshire in 2015 confirmed they died of heart failure caused by theobromine after they consumed 41 kg (90 lb) of chocolate and doughnuts placed at the site as bait. A similar incident killed a black bear cub in Michigan in 2011.

=== Pest control ===
In previous research, the USDA investigated the possible use of theobromine as a toxicant to control coyotes preying on livestock.

== See also ==
- Xanthine oxidase
