= Benadryl =

Brand of various antihistamine medications

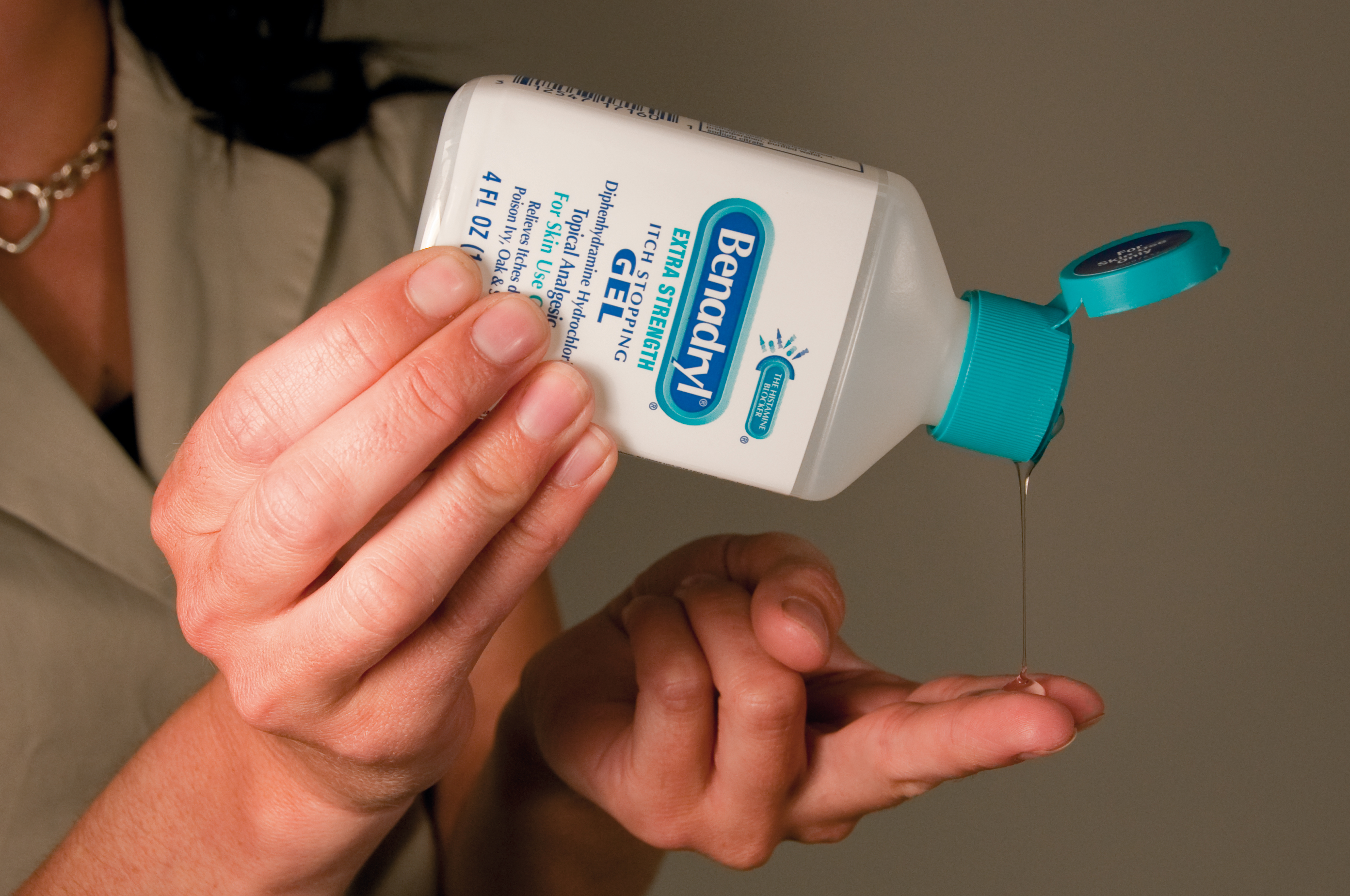
- A bottle of Benadryl (diphenhydramine) gel intended for use as a topical antipruritic.
- Type: Antihistamine, allergy medication
- Inception: 1946
- Manufacturer: Kenvue
- Available: Yes, OTC
- Website: www.benadryl.com

Benadryl is a brand of antihistamine medications used to treat allergies, whose content varies in different countries, but which may include diphenhydramine, acrivastine, or cetirizine.

It is sold by Kenvue and is used to relieve allergy symptoms such as sneezing, itching, runny nose, rash, and hives. Some forms of Benadryl are to be taken orally, while some creams and gels are to be applied to the skin. Common side effects of the drug include drowsiness, dizziness, dry mouth and throat, confusion, and blurred vision.

In the United States and Canada, the active ingredient is diphenhydramine. In the United Kingdom, the active ingredients of Benadryl are the second-generation antihistamines acrivastine or cetirizine. Benadryl is also sold as a cough medicine in Australia, India and New Zealand containing diphenhydramine, as well as the antitussive dextromethorphan or the expectorant guaifenesin.

== Types of Benadryl ==
There are many different forms of Benadryl found in different countries. In the United States and Canada, there are several versions of Benadryl for allergies, some to be taken orally and some as a topical analgesic. In Australia, New Zealand and India, Benadryl is known as a cough liquid.

=== Benadryl Allergy ===
Benadryl Allergy is the name of a Benadryl product found in the United States and Canada. It is an antihistamine drug used to relieve allergies. Its active ingredient is diphenhydramine, a first-generation antihistamine. It is known to be sedative, making drowsiness a common side effect. It is an oral drug to be taken by mouth, to relieve symptoms of allergy, hay fever and the common cold. It can also be used to relieve allergies such as itching, sneezing, runny nose, rash and hives.

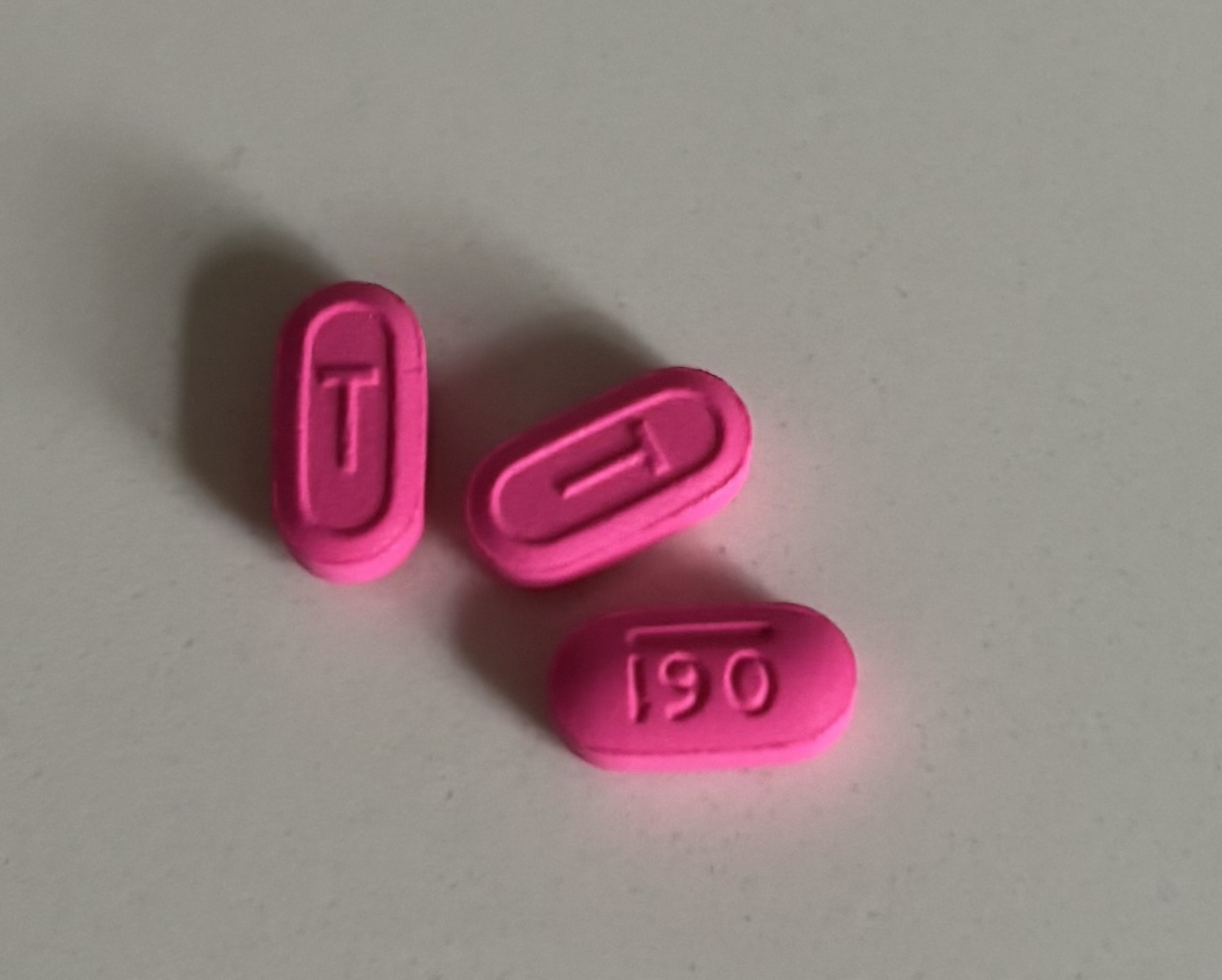
Benadryl Allergy tablets

Benadryl Allergy for Children is also available. It comes in liquid form and can be used to provide fast and effective relief for allergies such as sneezing, itchy, runny nose, itchy eyes and hives.

Benadryl Allergy is widely used as a sleep aid among adults. While it is not marketed as an over-the-counter (OTC) sleeping aid, most versions of Benadryl contain diphenhydramine, a drug with sedative properties. Diphenhydramine (Benadryl) has also been used by parents to help improve their infant's sleep habits. However, this has been met by criticism on whether it is appropriate to do so.

=== Benadryl Allergy Relief ===
In the United Kingdom, Benadryl can be found as Benadryl Allergy Relief. The main ingredient in this medication is acrivastine. Acrivastine is a non-drowsy antihistamine used to relieve allergies. It can treat hay fever, hives, insect bites and stings, conjunctivitis and eczema. Benadryl Allergy Relief contains 8 mg of acrivastine in each capsule. It is to be taken orally.

Benadryl Allergy Relief Plus Decongestant can also be found in the United Kingdom. It is used to relieve sinus, stuffy and runny nose, itchy eyes and sneezing. This version contains acrivastine and pseudoephedrine as its active ingredients. Pseudoephedrine is a decongestant used to relieve a nasal congestion. Benadryl Allergy Relief Plus Decongestant contains 8 mg of acrivastine and 60 mg of pseudoephedrine per capsule, and it is to be taken orally.

=== Benadryl Topical ===
Benadryl can also be found in a topical form including gels and creams. Benadryl Itch Stopping Cream is a topical cream used to provide temporary itch relief for allergies, hives or even some insect bites. It can be found in the United States and Canada. This topical medication contains 2% of diphenhydramine hydrochloride and 1% of zinc acetate. This medication is intended for topical use only and not to be ingested.

=== Benadryl Cough Syrup ===
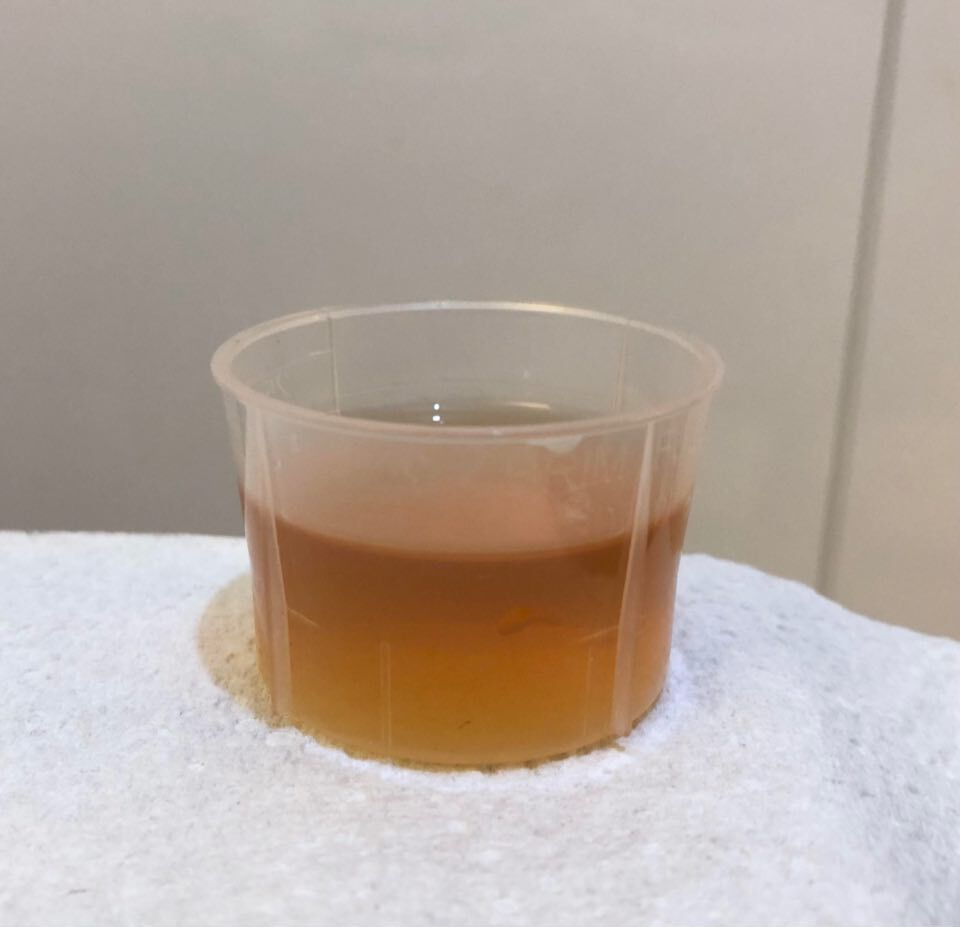
Cough syrup in a medicine measure cup

Benadryl in Australia and New Zealand comes in the form of a cough syrup. It is not to be confused with Benadryl for allergies. There are several forms of cough syrup available in the market for different types of coughs such as dry, tickly cough, chesty coughs and coughs with nasal congestion. Cough liquids for children are also available.

Benadryl Chesty Forte is used to relieve heavy chesty coughs and chest congestion. The main ingredients found are guaifenesin and bromhexine. It is to be taken orally to provide relief from cough and congested chests due to the common cold. Benadryl Dry, Tickly Cough Liquid is a cough medicine found in Australia. It is used to temporarily relieve irritating coughs. Pholcodine is the main ingredient found in this cough liquid. This medication is to be taken orally and may cause drowsiness.

In India, Benadryl can also be found in the form of a cough liquid and also cough lozenges. Benadryl Cough Syrup contains diphenhydramine, ammonium chloride and citrate as its main ingredients. It is used to relieve cough and cold, and also soothes the throat.

== Adverse effects ==
A common side effect of taking Benadryl containing diphenhydramine is drowsiness. Other common side effects can include dry mouth and throat. Symptoms such as confusion and blurred vision can also occur. Other side effects of taking Benadryl include headache and dizziness.

Diphenhydramine is a first-generation antihistamine and an anticholinergic drug. Anticholinergic drugs block the action of acetylcholine, a neurotransmitter in the central nervous system. Studies propose that long-term use of anticholinergic drugs is associated with an increased risk for dementia among older people. Long-term use of Benadryl can also lead to constipation and confusion.

== Interactions ==
Benadryl containing diphenhydramine can interact with alcohol as both are central nervous system (CNS) depressants. Side effects such as drowsiness and dizziness may be enhanced when taking alcohol with diphenhydramine. Mixing diphenhydramine with alcohol can also increase the chances of losing consciousness due to sedation. This combination can also lead to impaired motor skills and decreased alertness. Driving, operating machinery or any other activities that require full concentration and consciousness are not recommended as these effects persist.

Benadryl may interact with other medications such as anti-depressants, sleeping pills, muscle relaxants and other antihistamines. It is important to check with a professional before taking Benadryl with any other medications, vitamins and herbal products.

== History ==
In 1943, diphenhydramine was discovered by chemist George Rieveschl and one of his students, Fred Huber, while they were conducting research into muscle relaxants at the University of Cincinnati. Huber first synthesized diphenhydramine. Rieveschl then worked with Parke-Davis to test the compound, and the company licensed the patent from him.

In 1946, Benadryl was approved by the Food and Drug Administration (FDA) for prescription use. In 1982 it was approved as an over-the-counter medication.

Before 2007, Benadryl was marketed by Pfizer Consumer Healthcare (originally Warner–Lambert).

=== Recalls ===
On 15 January 2010, McNeil Consumer Healthcare, a subsidiary of Johnson & Johnson, recalled five lots of Benadryl due to the presence of an unusual odor linked to the chemical 2,4,6-tribromoanisole.

In April 2010, over four million packs of Benadryl Children Allergy tablets were recalled after it was revealed that they might contain a higher concentration of active ingredients than specified on the label, as well as inactive ingredients that had not met internal testing requirements.

=== Benadryl topical packaging change ===
In 2010, after the U.S. Food and Drug Administration (FDA) reported over one hundred cases of mistaken ingestion by mouth, the packaging of Benadryl Itch Stopping Gel was redesigned to include a new warning ("for skin use only"), and a sticker was added as an additional precaution.

== Society and culture ==
Diphenhydramine has a common side effect of drowsiness or sleepiness. Because of these sedative properties, Benadryl is often used as a sleep aid in people with insomnia. A study published in the American Journal of Geriatric Psychiatry discovered that approximately one in three adults between the ages of 65 and 80 occasionally use over-the-counter drugs like Benadryl to help with sleep. In 2017, American Academy of Sleep Medicine discouraged the use of over-the-counter antihistamines as a sleep aid in treating chronic insomnia. The usage of antihistamines as a sleep aid could cause sleepiness during the day, grogginess and falls.

=== Recreational usage and the 'Benadryl challenge' ===
In May 2020, the Cook Children's Medical Center in Fort Worth, Texas, reported that 3 teenagers had been hospitalized as a result of diphenhydramine overdose. They claimed that the teenagers had gotten information on how to abuse Benadryl from the social media app TikTok. That August, an Oklahoma teen reportedly died from a Benadryl overdose. After a later-deleted Facebook post by the teen's family member claimed that the death was the result of a "Benadryl challenge," news outlets reported on the dangers of the supposed social media trend. This prompted the FDA to release a statement on the dangers of high doses of diphenhydramine.

== Availability ==
Benadryl is available as an over-the-counter (OTC) drug in most countries. Benadryl can be found in several countries including the United States, Canada, United Kingdom, Australia, New Zealand, India, Indonesia and the Philippines.

Benadryl comes in oral tablets and oral liquid to be taken by mouth. Some types of Benadryl such as Benadryl Itch Stopping Cream and gels are meant to be applied to the skin, not to be ingested.
