= Xanthine =

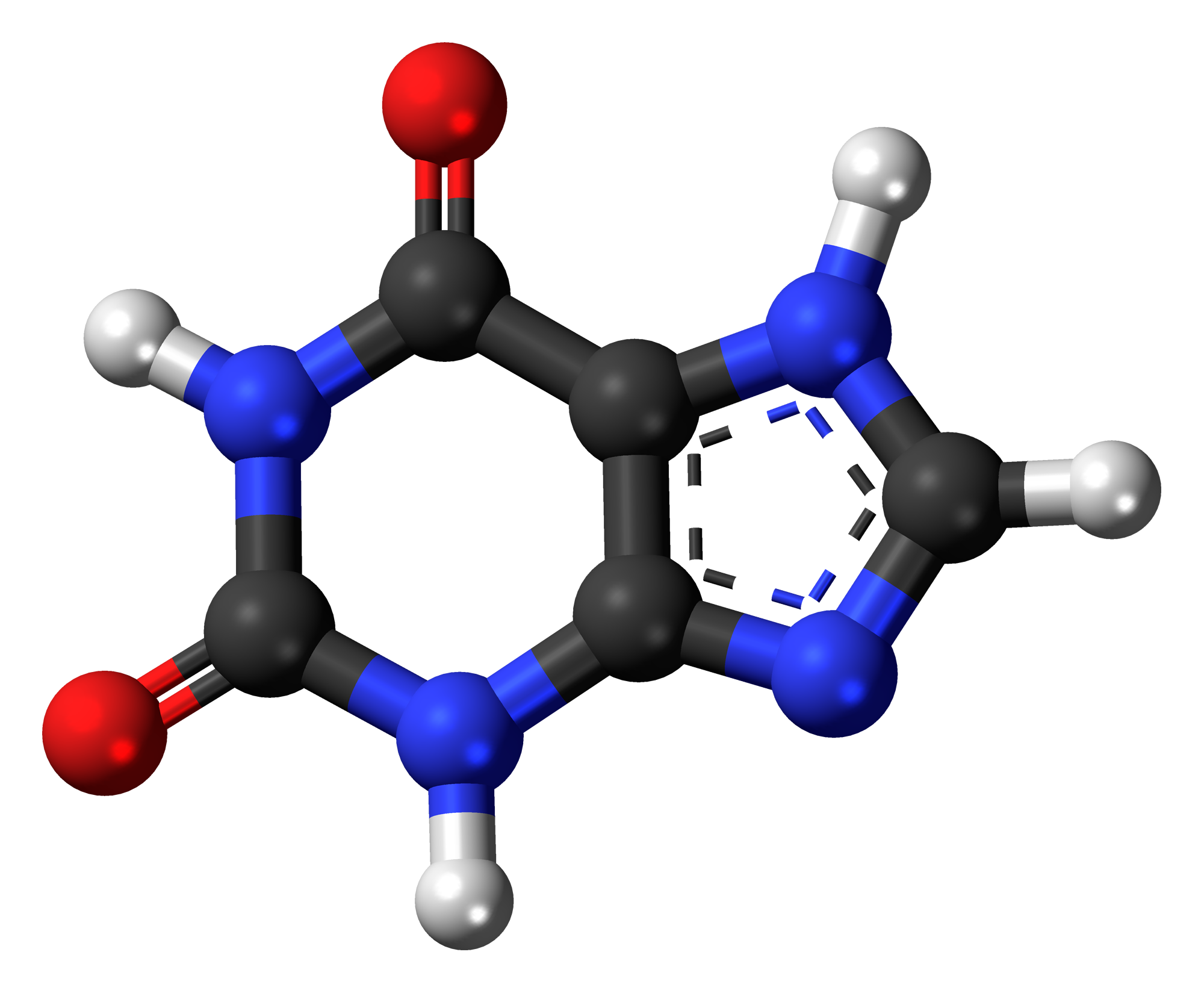

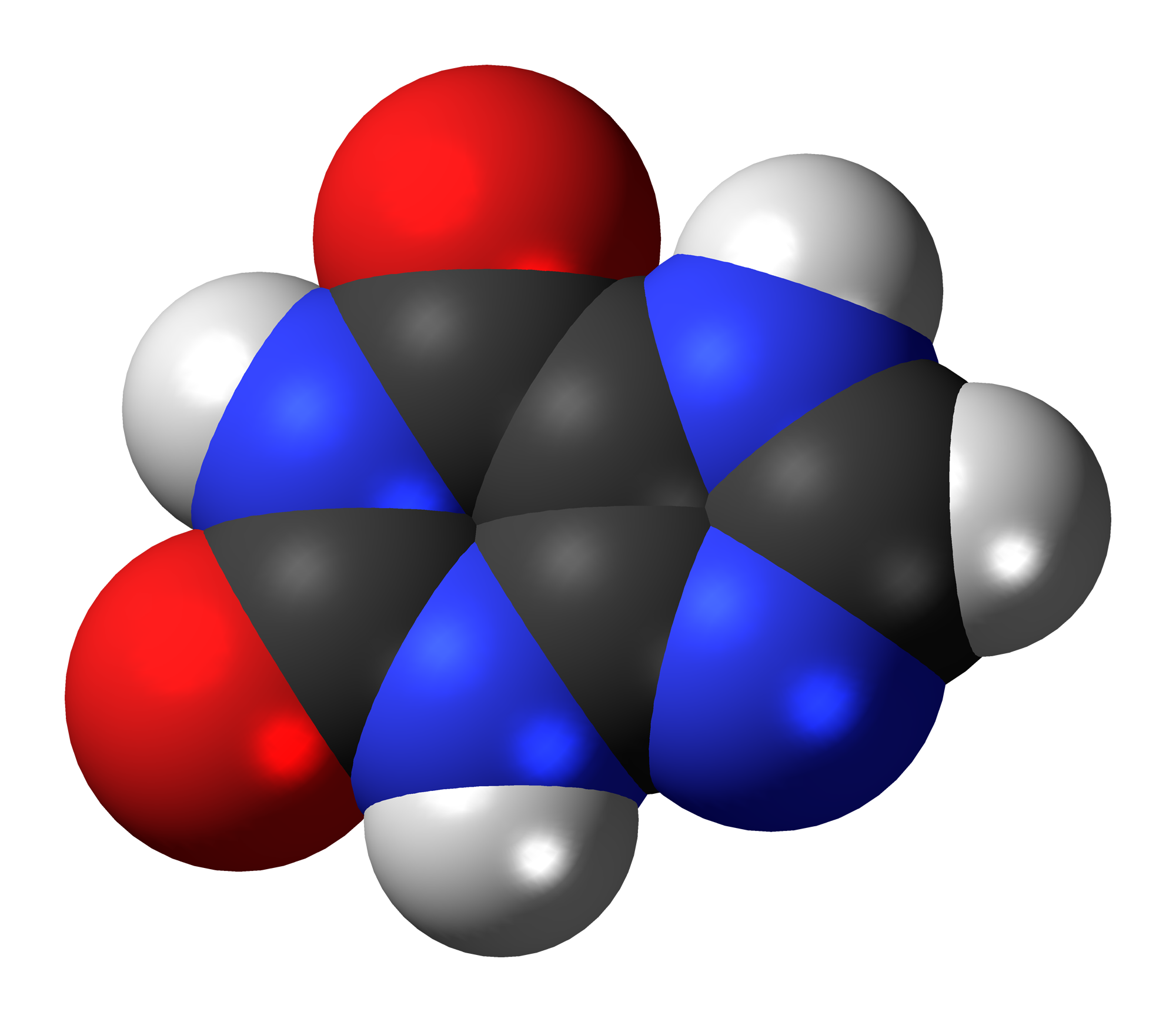

Names
- Preferred IUPAC name 3,7-Dihydro-1H-purine-2,6-dione
- Other names 1H-Purine-2,6-dione

Identifiers
CAS Number	69-89-6
3D model (JSmol)	Interactive image
ChEBI	CHEBI:17712
ChEMBL	ChEMBL1424
ChemSpider	1151
DrugBank	DB02134
ECHA InfoCard	100.000.653
IUPHAR/BPS	4557
KEGG	C00385
PubChem CID	1188
UNII	1AVZ07U9S7
CompTox Dashboard (EPA)	DTXSID4035120
- InChI: InChI=1S/C5H4N4O2/c10-4-2-3(7-1-6-2)8-5(11)9-4/h1H,(H3,6,7,8,9,10,11) Key: LRFVTYWOQMYALW-UHFFFAOYSA-N; InChI=1S/C5H4N4O2/c10-4-2-3(7-1-6-2)8-5(11)9-4/h1H,(H3,6,7,8,9,10,11); InChI=1S/C5H4N4O2/c10-4-2-3(7-1-6-2)8-5(11)9-4/h1H,(H3,6,7,8,9,10,11) Key: LRFVTYWOQMYALW-UHFFFAOYSA-N
- SMILES: c1[nH]c2c(n1)C(=O)NC(=O)N2

Properties
Chemical formula	C_{5}H_{4}N_{4}O_{2}
Molar mass	152.11 g/mol
Appearance	White solid
Melting point	decomposes
Solubility in water	1 g/ 14.5 L @ 16 °C; 1 g/1.4 L @ 100 °C

Hazards
NFPA 704 (fire diamond)	2 1 0
- Except where otherwise noted, data are given for materials in their standard state (at 25 °C [77 °F], 100 kPa). verify (what is ?) Infobox references

Xanthine (/ˈzænθiːn/ or /ˈzænθaɪn/, from Ancient Greek ξανθός xanthós 'yellow' for its yellowish-white appearance; archaically xanthic acid; systematic name 3,7-dihydropurine-2,6-dione) is a purine base found in most human body tissues and fluids, as well as in other organisms. Several stimulants are derived from xanthine, including caffeine, theophylline, and theobromine.

Xanthine is a product on the pathway of purine degradation.

- It is created from guanine by guanine deaminase.
- It is created from hypoxanthine by xanthine oxidoreductase.
- It is also created from xanthosine by purine nucleoside phosphorylase.

Xanthine is subsequently converted to uric acid by the action of the xanthine oxidase enzyme.

== Use and production ==
Xanthine is used as a drug precursor for human and animal medications, and is produced as a pesticide ingredient.

== Clinical significance ==
Derivatives of xanthine (known collectively as xanthines) are a group of alkaloids commonly used for their effects as mild stimulants and as bronchodilators, notably in the treatment of asthma or influenza symptoms. In contrast to other, more potent stimulants like sympathomimetic amines, xanthines mainly act to oppose the actions of adenosine, and increase alertness in the central nervous system.

=== Toxicity ===
Methylxanthines (methylated xanthines), which include caffeine, aminophylline, IBMX, paraxanthine, pentoxifylline, theobromine, theophylline, and 7-methylxanthine (heteroxanthine), among others, affect the airways, increase heart rate and force of contraction, and at high concentrations can cause cardiac arrhythmias. In high doses, they can lead to convulsions that are resistant to anticonvulsants. Methylxanthines induce gastric acid and pepsin secretions in the gastrointestinal tract. Methylxanthines are metabolized by cytochrome P450 enzymes in the liver.

If swallowed, inhaled, or exposed to the eyes in high amounts, xanthines can be harmful, and they may cause an allergic reaction if applied topically.

=== Pharmacology ===
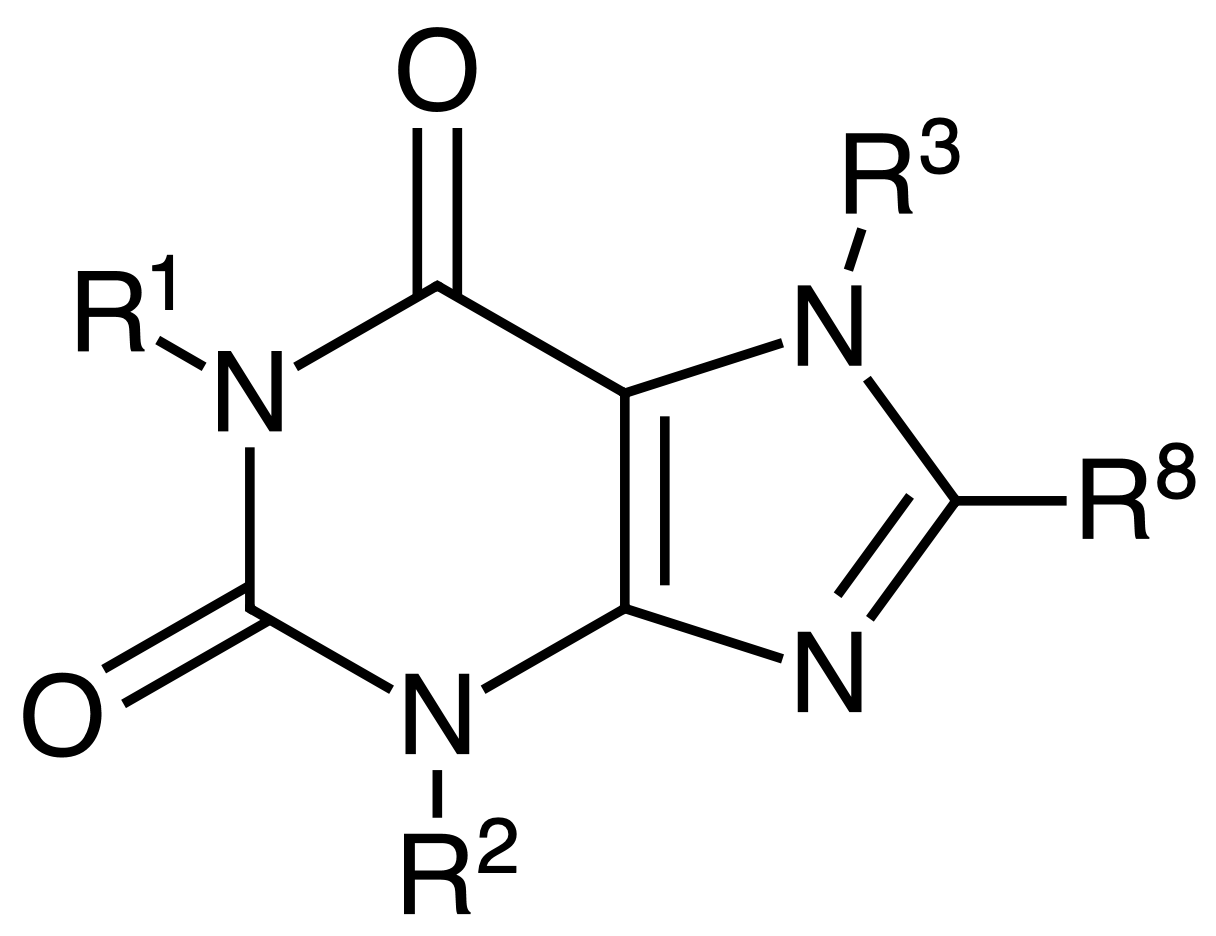
Xanthine: R_{1} = R_{2} = R_{3} = H Caffeine: R_{1} = R_{2} = R_{3} = CH_{3} Theobromine: R_{1} = H, R_{2} = R_{3} = CH_{3} Theophylline: R_{1} = R_{2} = CH_{3}, R_{3} = H

In in vitro pharmacological studies, xanthines act as both competitive nonselective phosphodiesterase inhibitors and nonselective adenosine receptor antagonists. Phosphodiesterase inhibitors raise intracellular cAMP, activate PKA, inhibit TNF-α synthesis, and leukotriene and reduce inflammation and innate immunity. Adenosine receptor antagonists inhibit sleepiness-inducing adenosine.

However, different analogues show varying potency at the numerous subtypes, and a wide range of synthetic xanthines (some nonmethylated) have been developed searching for compounds with greater selectivity for phosphodiesterase enzyme or adenosine receptor subtypes.

Examples of xanthine derivatives
Name	R_{1}	R_{2}	R_{3}	R_{8}	IUPAC nomenclature	Found in
Xanthine	H	H	H	H	3,7-Dihydro-purine-2,6-dione	Plants, animals
7-Methylxanthine	H	H	CH_{3}	H	7-methyl-3H-purine-2,6-dione	Metabolite of caffeine and theobromine
Theobromine	H	CH_{3}	CH_{3}	H	3,7-Dihydro-3,7-dimethyl-1H-purine-2,6-dione	Cacao (chocolate), yerba mate, kola, guayusa
Theophylline	CH_{3}	CH_{3}	H	H	1,3-Dimethyl-7H-purine-2,6-dione	Tea, cacao (chocolate), yerba mate, kola
Paraxanthine	CH_{3}	H	CH_{3}	H	1,7-Dimethyl-7H-purine-2,6-dione	Animals that have consumed caffeine
Caffeine	CH_{3}	CH_{3}	CH_{3}	H	1,3,7-Trimethyl-1H-purine-2,6(3H,7H)-dione	Coffee, guarana, yerba mate, tea, kola, guayusa, Cacao (chocolate)
8-Bromocaffeine	CH_{3}	CH_{3}	CH_{3}	Br	8-bromo-1,3,7-trimethylpurine-2,6-dione	Radiosensitizer in radiotherapy
8-Chlorotheophylline	CH_{3}	CH_{3}	H	Cl	8-Chloro-1,3-dimethyl-7H-purine-2,6-dione	Synthetic pharmaceutical ingredient
8-Bromotheophylline	CH_{3}	CH_{3}	H	Br	8-Bromo-1,3-dimethyl-7H-purine-2,6-dione	Pamabrom diuretic medication
Diprophylline	CH_{3}	CH_{3}	C_{3}H_{7}O_{2}	H	7-(2,3-Dihydroxypropyl)-1,3-dimethyl-3,7-dihydro-1H-purine-2,6-dione	Synthetic pharmaceutical ingredient
IBMX	CH_{3}	C_{4}H_{9}	H	H	1-Methyl-3-(2-methylpropyl)-7H-purine-2,6-dione	
Uric acid	H	H	H	O	7,9-Dihydro-1H-purine-2,6,8(3H)-trione	Byproduct of purine nucleotides metabolism and a normal component of urine

=== Pathology ===
People with rare genetic disorders, specifically xanthinuria and Lesch–Nyhan syndrome, lack sufficient xanthine oxidase and cannot convert xanthine to uric acid.

== Possible formation in absence of life ==
Studies reported in 2008, based on ^{12}C/^{13}C isotopic ratios of organic compounds found in the Murchison meteorite, suggested that xanthine and related chemicals, including the RNA component uracil, have been formed extraterrestrially. In August 2011, a report, based on NASA studies with meteorites found on Earth, was published suggesting xanthine and related organic molecules, including the DNA and RNA components adenine and guanine, were found in outer space.

== See also ==
- DMPX
- Murchison meteorite
- Theobromine poisoning
- Xanthene
- Xanthone
- Xanthydrol
- Kidney stone disease
