= Diprophylline =

Bronchiodilator

Clinical data
- Trade names: Lufyllin
- Other names: 7-(2,3-Dihydroxy-propyl)theophylline
- AHFS/Drugs.com: Consumer Drug Information
- MedlinePlus: a682494
- Routes of administration: By mouth
- ATC code: R03DA01 (WHO)

Legal status
- Legal status: US: ℞-only

Identifiers
- IUPAC name: 7-(2,3-Dihydroxypropyl)-1,3-dimethyl-3,7-dihydro-1H-purine-2,6-dione
- CAS Number: 479-18-5
- PubChem CID: 3182
- IUPHAR/BPS: 7070
- DrugBank: DB00651
- ChemSpider: 3070
- UNII: 263T0E9RR9
- KEGG: D00691
- ChEBI: CHEBI:4728
- ChEMBL: ChEMBL1752
- CompTox Dashboard (EPA): DTXSID6022975
- ECHA InfoCard: 100.006.843

Chemical and physical data
- Formula: C_{10}H_{14}N_{4}O_{4}
- Molar mass: 254.246 g·mol^{−1}
- 3D model (JSmol): Interactive image
- SMILES: O=C2N(c1ncn(c1C(=O)N2C)CC(O)CO)C
- InChI: InChI=1S/C10H14N4O4/c1-12-8-7(9(17)13(2)10(12)18)14(5-11-8)3-6(16)4-15/h5-6,15-16H,3-4H2,1-2H3; Key:KSCFJBIXMNOVSH-UHFFFAOYSA-N

Diprophylline (INN) or dyphylline (USAN) (trade names Dilor, Lufyllin) is a xanthine derivative with bronchodilator and vasodilator effects. It is used in the treatment of respiratory disorders like asthma, cardiac dyspnea, and bronchitis. It acts as an adenosine receptor antagonist and phosphodiesterase inhibitor.

== See also ==
- Xanthine
