= Pamabrom =

Pharmaceutical drug

Clinical data
- AHFS/Drugs.com: Multum Consumer Information
- MedlinePlus: a681004
- ATC code: none

Legal status
- Legal status: US: OTC

Identifiers
- IUPAC name: 1:1 mixture of 2-amino-2-methyl-1-propanol and 8-bromotheophyllinate
- CAS Number: 606-04-2
- PubChem CID: 11806
- ChemSpider: 11313
- UNII: UA8U0KJM72
- ChEMBL: ChEMBL2104825
- CompTox Dashboard (EPA): DTXSID80209397
- ECHA InfoCard: 100.009.186

Chemical and physical data
- Formula: 8-Bromotheophylline: C_{7}H_{7}BrN_{4}O_{2} 2-Amino-2-methyl-1-propanol: C_{4}H_{11}NO
- Molar mass: 348.20 g/mol
- 3D model (JSmol): Interactive image
- SMILES: Cn2c(=O)c1[nH]c(Br)nc1n(C)c2=O.NC(C)(C)CO
- InChI: InChI=1S/C7H7BrN4O2.C4H11NO/c1-11-4-3(9-6(8)10-4)5(13)12(2)7(11)14;1-4(2,5)3-6/h1-2H3,(H,9,10);6H,3,5H2,1-2H3; Key:ATOTUUBRFJHZQG-UHFFFAOYSA-N

Pamabrom is a product included in retail drugs available in over-the-counter medications. The active diuretic ingredient in pamabrom is 8-bromotheophylline and it also contains aminoisobutanol.

Pamabrom is available in combination with acetaminophen (paracetamol) for various conditions such as back pain and menstrual relief. The acetaminophen helps reduce menstrual pains and the pamabrom reduces associated bloating. The combination is available in a number of products from various brands under different names (Midol Teen, others). The dosages are essentially the same for each brand, including generic drug store varieties.

A diuretic is also used to reduce edema (fluid buildup) in the body. Edema can cause swelling of the extremities, such as in the hands and feet. Edema can make it harder for the heart to work properly, and it can be related to congestive heart failure.
