= Aminohydrolase =

Class of enzymes

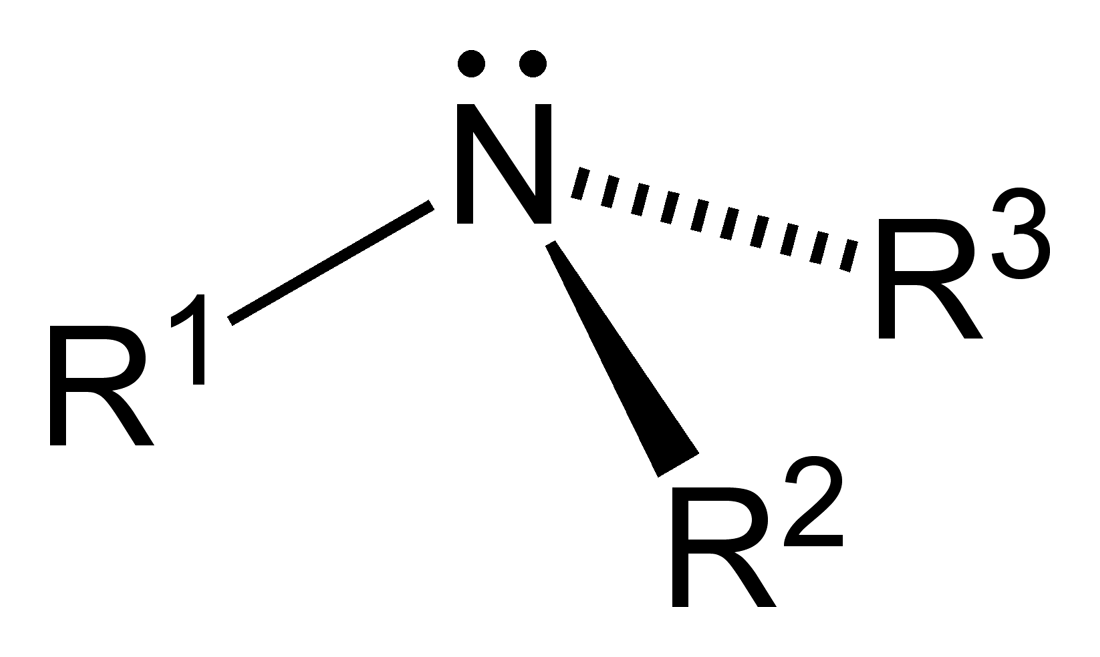
The general structure of an amine

An aminohydrolase is a hydrolase enzyme which acts upon an amino group.

Aminohydrolases are classified under EC number EC 3.5.4.
