= Diphenhydramine =

Antihistamine medication

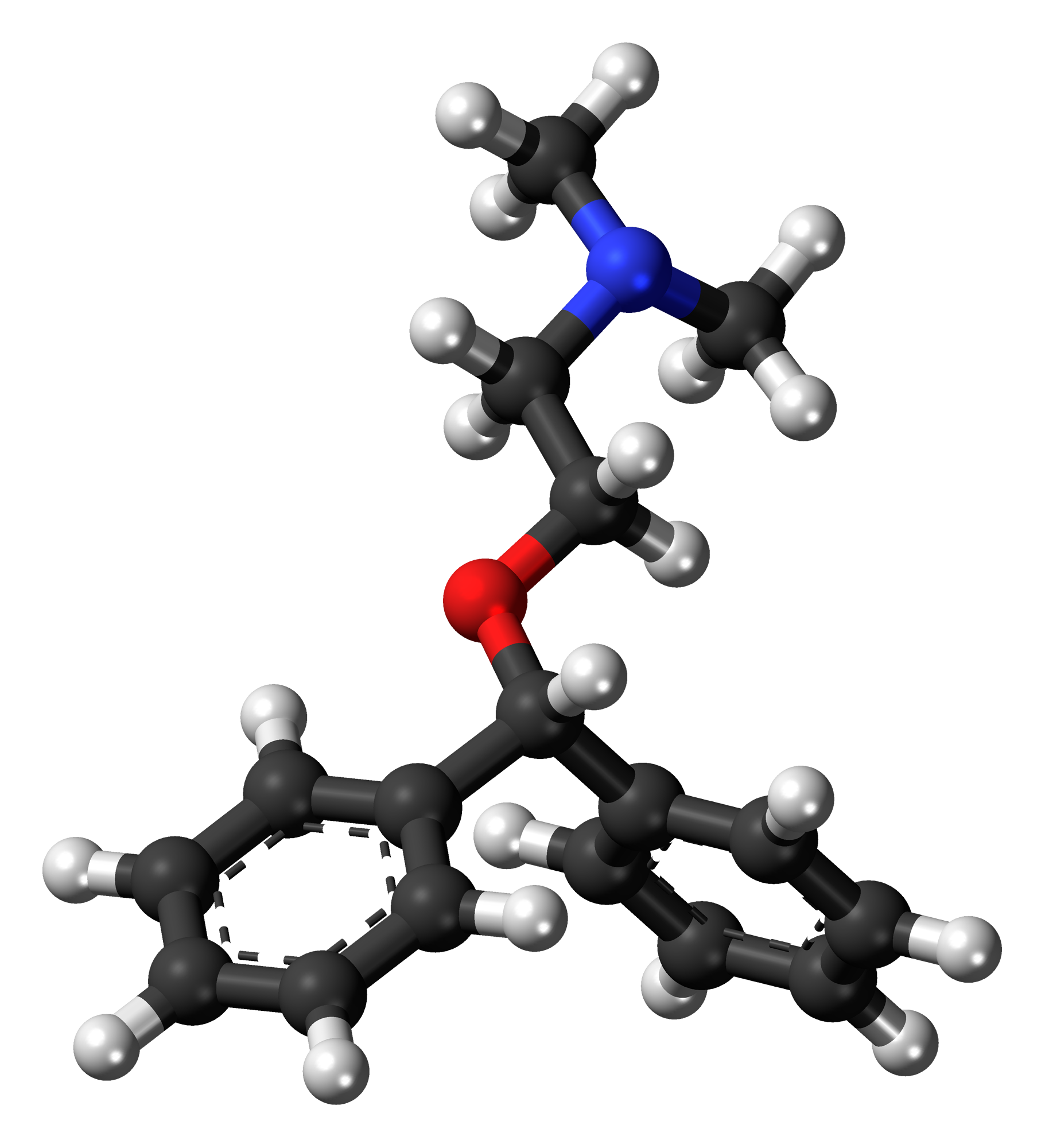

Clinical data
- Pronunciation: /ˌdaɪfɛnˈhaɪdrəmiːn/
- Trade names: Benadryl, others
- AHFS/Drugs.com: Monograph
- MedlinePlus: a682539
- License data: US DailyMed: Diphenhydramine
- Pregnancy category: AU: A
- Dependence liability: Low
- Routes of administration: By mouth, intramuscular, intravenous, topical, rectal
- Drug class: First-generation antihistamine, antimuscarinic, hallucinogen (deliriant), sedative
- ATC code: D04AA32 (WHO) D04AA33 (WHO), R06AA02 (WHO)

Legal status
- Legal status: AU: S4 (Prescription only) / S2 (Pharmacy Medicine) / S3 (Pharmacist Only Medicine); CA: OTC; UK: P (Pharmacy medicines); US: OTC / Rx-only; UN: Unscheduled; SE: Rx-only

Pharmacokinetic data
- Bioavailability: 40–60%
- Protein binding: 78-85%
- Metabolism: Liver (CYP2D6, others)
- Metabolites: N-Desmethyldiphenhydramine, N,N-Didesmethyldiphenhydramine, others
- Onset of action: ~1 hour
- Elimination half-life: Range: 2.4–13.5 hours
- Excretion: Urine: 94% Feces: 6%

Identifiers
- IUPAC name: 2-(diphenylmethoxy)-N,N-dimethylethanamine
- CAS Number: 58-73-1
- PubChem CID: 3100
- IUPHAR/BPS: 1224
- DrugBank: DB01075
- ChemSpider: 2989
- UNII: 8GTS82S83M
- KEGG: D00300
- ChEBI: CHEBI:4636
- ChEMBL: ChEMBL657
- CompTox Dashboard (EPA): DTXSID4022949
- ECHA InfoCard: 100.000.360

Chemical and physical data
- Formula: C_{17}H_{21}NO
- Molar mass: 255.361 g·mol^{−1}
- 3D model (JSmol): Interactive image
- SMILES: O(CCN(C)C)C(c1ccccc1)c2ccccc2
- InChI: InChI=1S/C17H21NO/c1-18(2)13-14-19-17(15-9-5-3-6-10-15)16-11-7-4-8-12-16/h3-12,17H,13-14H2,1-2H3; Key:ZZVUWRFHKOJYTH-UHFFFAOYSA-N

Diphenhydramine, or Diphenylhydramine, sold under the brand name Benadryl among others, is an antihistamine and sedative. Although generally considered sedating, diphenhydramine can cause paradoxical central nervous system stimulation in some individuals, particularly at higher doses. This may manifest as agitation, anxiety, or restlessness rather than sedation. It is a first-generation H_{1}-antihistamine (i.e. it blocks histamine) with sedative effects. Diphenhydramine is also a potent anticholinergic. It is mainly used to treat allergies, insomnia, and symptoms of the common cold. It is also less commonly used for tremors in parkinsonism, and nausea. It is taken by mouth, injected into a vein, injected into a muscle, or applied to the skin. Maximal effect is typically around two hours after an oral dose, and effects can last for up to seven hours.

Common side effects include sleepiness, poor coordination, and an upset stomach. There is no clear risk of harm when used during pregnancy; however, use during breastfeeding is not recommended.

It was developed by George Rieveschl and put into commercial use in 1946. It is available as a generic medication. In 2023, it was the 294th most commonly prescribed medication in the United States, with more than 700,000 prescriptions.

Its sedative and deliriant effects have led to some cases of recreational use.

== Medical uses ==
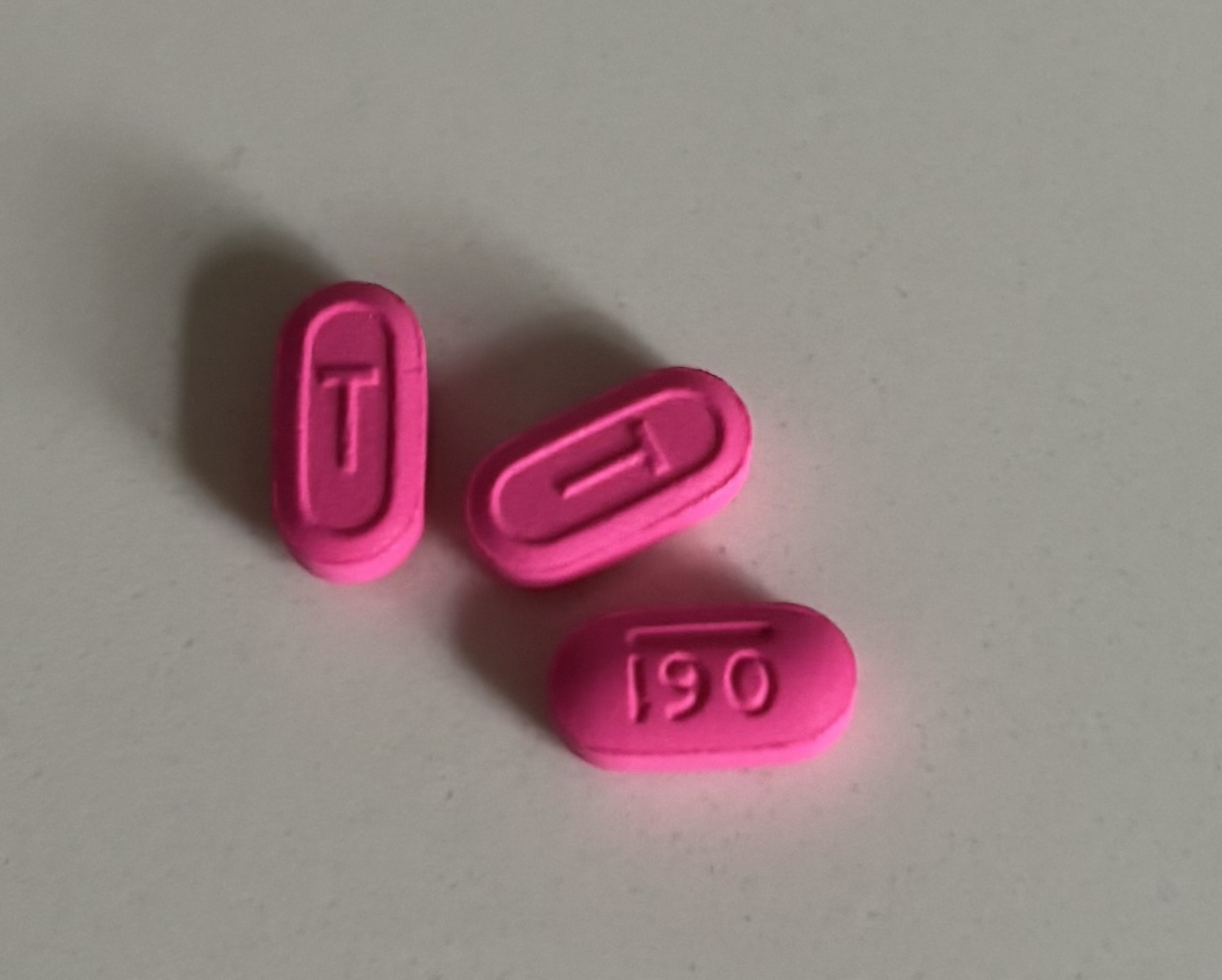
Picture of generic Diphenhydramine tablets

Diphenhydramine is a first-generation antihistamine used to treat several conditions including allergic symptoms and itchiness, the common cold, insomnia, motion sickness, and extrapyramidal symptoms. Diphenhydramine also has local anesthetic properties, and has been used as such in people allergic to common local anesthetics such as lidocaine.

=== Allergies ===
Diphenhydramine is effective in the treatment of allergies. As of 2007, it was the most commonly used antihistamine for acute allergic reactions in the emergency department.

By injection, it is often used in addition to epinephrine for anaphylaxis, although as of 2007 its use for this purpose had not been properly studied. Its use is only recommended once acute symptoms have improved.

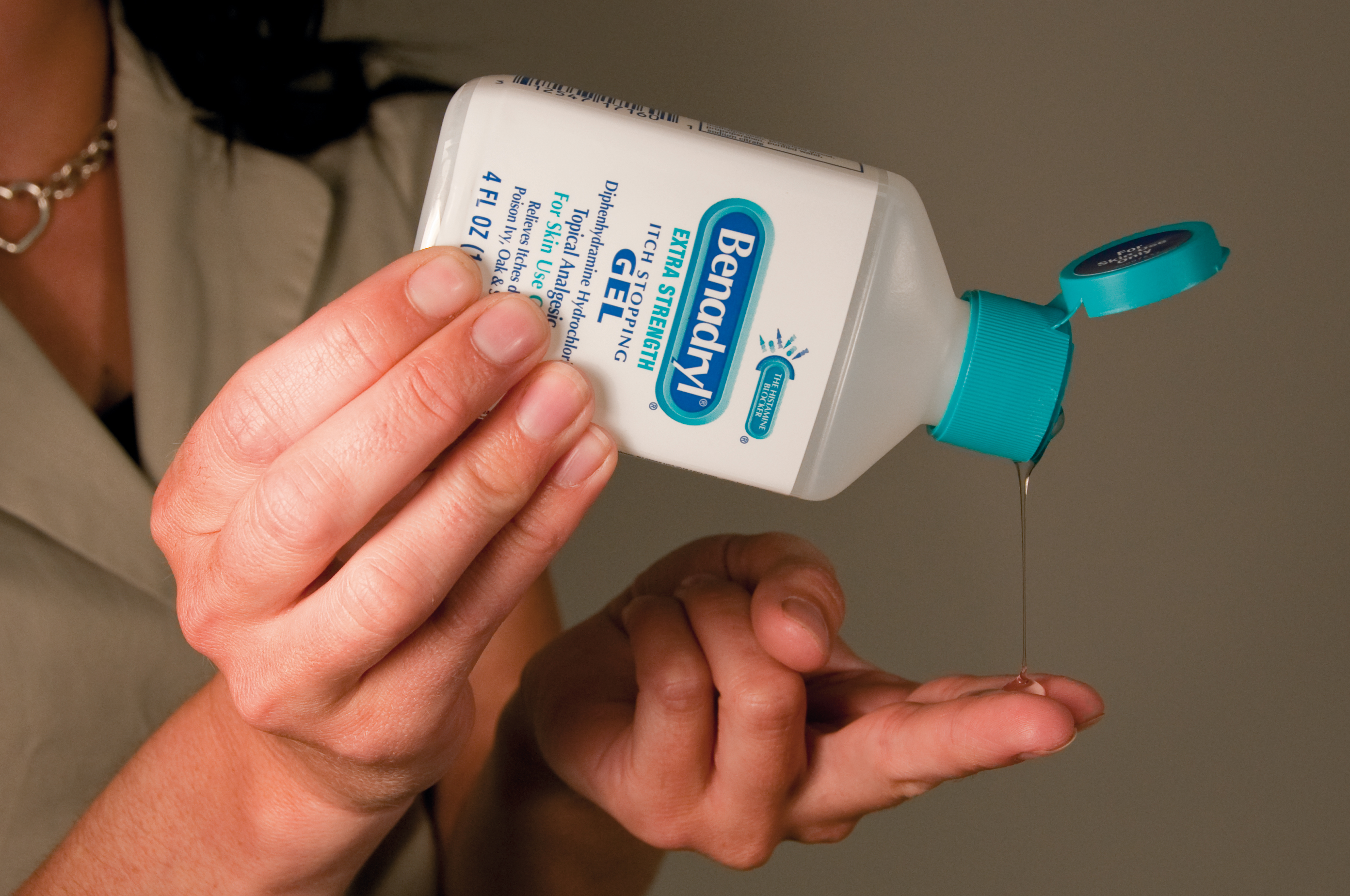
A bottle of topical "Itch-Stopping Gel" diphenhydramine

Topical formulations of diphenhydramine are available, including creams, lotions, gels, sprays, and eye drops. These are used to relieve itching and have the advantage of causing fewer systemic effects (such as drowsiness) than oral forms.

=== Movement disorders ===
Diphenhydramine is used to treat parkinsonism. It is also used to treat acute dystonia, including torticollis and oculogyric crisis caused by typical antipsychotics.

=== Sleep ===
Because of its sedative properties, diphenhydramine is widely used in nonprescription sleep aids for insomnia. The drug is an ingredient in several products sold as sleep aids. Diphenhydramine can cause minor psychological dependence. Diphenhydramine has also been used as an anxiolytic.

Diphenhydramine has been used off-label by parents in an attempt to make their children sleep and to sedate them on long-distance flights. This has been met with criticism, both by doctors and by members of the airline industry, because sedating passengers may put them at risk if they cannot react efficiently to emergencies, and because the drug's side effects, especially the chance of a paradoxical reaction, may make some users hyperactive. Addressing such use, the Seattle Children's Hospital argued, in a 2009 article, "Using a medication for your convenience is never an indication for medication in a child."

The American Academy of Sleep Medicine's 2017 clinical practice guidelines recommended against the use of diphenhydramine in the treatment of insomnia, because of poor effectiveness and low quality of evidence. A major systematic review and network meta-analysis of medications for the treatment of insomnia published in 2022 found little evidence to inform the use of diphenhydramine for insomnia.

=== Nausea ===
Diphenhydramine also has antiemetic properties, which makes it useful in treating the nausea that occurs in vertigo and motion sickness. However, when taken above the recommended doses, it can cause nausea (especially above 200 mg). Diphenhydramine is the active ingredient in Dramamine, aka Gravol.

=== Anxiety ===
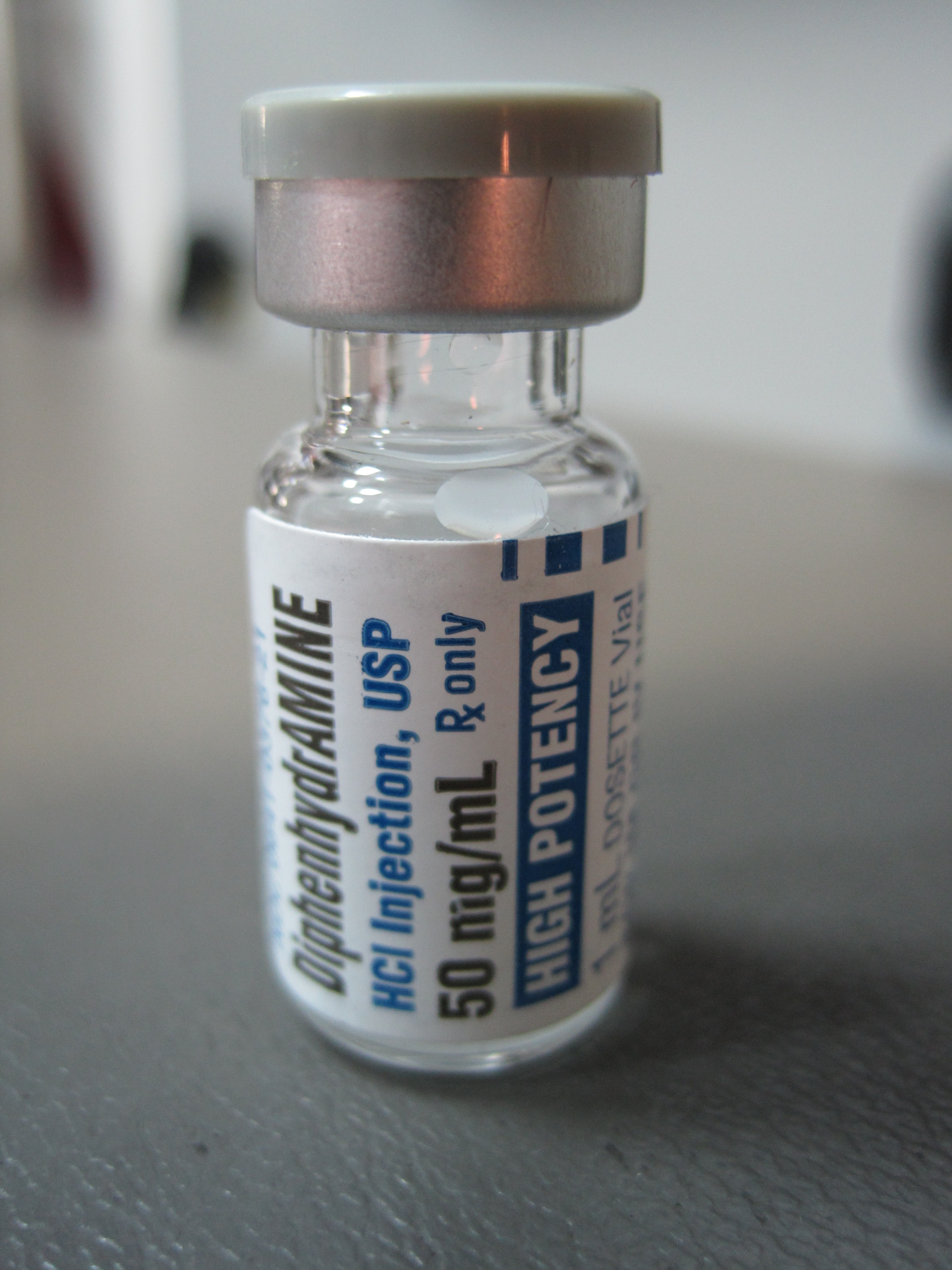
Diphenhydramine

Diphenhydramine is not typically used to treat anxiety because its long-term use may cause adverse effects, such as memory loss, especially in the elderly. Diphenhydramine is not approved by the US Food and Drug Administration (FDA) for treating anxiety. On the other hand, hydroxyzine, a first-generation antihistamine that lacks significant anticholinergic effects, may be used to treat anxiety, although benzodiazepines and antidepressants are considered more effective by most clinicians. The mild anxiolytic effects of hydroxyzine are mostly due to its weak but significant activity as an antagonist of the 5-HT_{2A} receptor, a common target of most antidepressant drugs (as well as certain other antihistamines like cyproheptadine and promethazine). Diphenhydramine is not known to bind to the 5-HT_{2A} receptor, though it is a weak antagonist of the related 5-HT_{2C} receptor, which is another target of antidepressant drugs and has a significant role in mood and anxiety.

=== Akathisia ===
Diphenhydramine 50-100 mg may be used to treat akathisia.

== Contraindications ==
Diphenhydramine is contraindicated in premature infants and neonates, as well as people who are breastfeeding. It is a pregnancy Category B drug. Diphenhydramine has additive effects with alcohol and other depressants. Monoamine oxidase inhibitors (MAOIs) prolong and intensify the anticholinergic effect of antihistamines.

== Adverse effects ==
The most prominent side effects are dizziness and sleepiness.

Diphenhydramine is a potent anticholinergic agent and a potential deliriant in higher doses. This activity is responsible for the side effects of dry mouth and throat, increased heart rate, pupil dilation, urinary retention, constipation, and, at high doses, hallucinations or delirium. Other side effects include motor impairment (ataxia), flushed skin, blurred vision at nearpoint owing to lack of accommodation (cycloplegia), abnormal sensitivity to bright light (photophobia), sedation, difficulty concentrating, short-term memory loss, visual disturbances, irregular breathing, dizziness, irritability, itchy skin, confusion, increased body temperature (in general, in the hands or feet), temporary erectile dysfunction, and excitability, and although it can be used to treat nausea, higher doses may cause vomiting. Diphenhydramine in overdose may occasionally result in QT prolongation.

Some individuals experience an allergic reaction to diphenhydramine in the form of hives.

Conditions such as restlessness or akathisia can worsen from increased levels of diphenhydramine, especially with recreational dosages. Normal doses of diphenhydramine, like other first-generation antihistamines, can also make symptoms of restless legs syndrome worse. As diphenhydramine is extensively metabolized by the liver, caution should be exercised when giving the drug to individuals with hepatic impairment.

Anticholinergic use later in life is associated with an increased risk for cognitive decline and dementia among older people. These findings have resulted in a blanket association between diphenhydramine and increased risk of dementia in older patients. However, studies have found only certain classes of anticholinergic agents associated with this risk. A large, nested case-control study, published in JAMA in 2019, found that "Associations were strongest for the anticholinergic antidepressants, bladder antimuscarinics, antipsychotics, and antiepileptic drugs." Further, "There were no significantly increased risks for antihistamines" Drowsiness, memory loss, confusion, dry mouth or constipation may occur in elderly people.

=== Special populations ===
Diphenhydramine is secreted in breast milk. It is expected that low doses of diphenhydramine taken occasionally will cause no adverse effects in breastfed infants. Large doses and long-term use may affect the baby or reduce breast milk supply, especially when combined with sympathomimetic drugs, such as pseudoephedrine, or before the establishment of lactation. A single bedtime dose after the last feeding of the day may minimize the harmful effects of the medication on the baby and the milk supply. Still, non-sedating antihistamines are preferred.

Paradoxical reactions to diphenhydramine have been documented, particularly in children, and it may cause excitation instead of sedation.

Topical diphenhydramine is sometimes used, especially for people in hospice. This use is without indication, and topical diphenhydramine should not be used as treatment for nausea because research has not shown that this therapy is more effective than others.

== Overdose ==
Diphenhydramine is one of the most commonly misused over-the-counter drugs in the United States. Overdose symptoms may include:

- Abdominal pain
- Abnormal speech (inaudibility, forced speech, etc.)
- Acute megacolon
- Anxiety/nervousness
- Coma
- Delirium
- Disorientation
- Dissociation
- Dysphoria
- Extreme drowsiness
- Flushed skin
- Hallucinations (auditory, visual, tactile, etc.)
- Heart palpitations
- Inability to urinate
- Motor disturbances
- Muscle spasms
- Seizures
- Severe dizziness
- Severe mouth and throat dryness
- Tremors
- Vomiting

Acute poisoning can be fatal, leading to cardiovascular collapse and death in 2–18 hours, and in general, is treated using a symptomatic and supportive approach. Diagnosis of toxicity is based on history and clinical presentation, and in general, precise plasma levels do not appear to provide useful relevant clinical information. Several levels of evidence strongly indicate diphenhydramine (similar to chlorpheniramine) can block the delayed rectifier potassium channel and, as a consequence, prolong the QT interval, leading to cardiac arrhythmias such as torsades de pointes. No specific antidote for diphenhydramine toxicity is known, but the anticholinergic syndrome has been treated with physostigmine for severe delirium or tachycardia. Benzodiazepines may be administered to decrease the likelihood of psychosis, agitation, and seizures in people who are prone to these symptoms.

== Interactions ==
Alcohol may increase the drowsiness caused by diphenhydramine.

== Pharmacology ==
=== Pharmacodynamics ===
Diphenhydramine
Site	K_{i} (nM)	Species	Ref
SERT	3800+	Human	
NET	960–2400	Human	
DAT	1100–2200	Human	
5-HT_{2C}	780	Human	
α_{1B}	1300	Human	
α_{2A}	2900	Human	
α_{2B}	1600	Human	
α_{2C}	2100	Human	
D_{2}	20000	Rat	
H_{1}	9.6–16	Human	
H_{2}	100000+	Canine	
H_{3}	10000+	Human	
H_{4}	10000+	Human	
M_{1}	80–100	Human	
M_{2}	120–490	Human	
M_{3}	84–229	Human	
M_{4}	53–112	Human	
M_{5}	30–260	Human	
VGSC	48000–86000	Rat	
hERG	27100 (IC_{50})	Human	
Values are K_{i} (nM), unless otherwise noted. The smaller the value, the more strongly the drug binds to the site.

Diphenhydramine, while historically known as an antagonist, acts primarily as an inverse agonist of the histamine H_{1} receptor. It is a member of the ethanolamine class of antihistaminergic agents. By reversing the effects of histamine on the capillaries, it can reduce the intensity of allergic symptoms. It also crosses the blood–brain barrier and inversely agonizes the H_{1} receptors centrally. Its effects on central H_{1} receptors cause drowsiness.

Diphenhydramine is a potent antimuscarinic (a competitive antagonist of muscarinic acetylcholine receptors) and, as such, at high doses can cause anticholinergic syndrome. The utility of diphenhydramine as an antiparkinson agent is the result of its blocking properties on the muscarinic acetylcholine receptors in the brain.

Diphenhydramine also acts as an intracellular sodium channel blocker, which is responsible for its actions as a local anesthetic. Diphenhydramine has also been shown to inhibit the reuptake of serotonin. It has been shown to be a potentiator of analgesia induced by morphine, but not by endogenous opioids, in rats. The drug has also been found to act as an inhibitor of histamine N-methyltransferase (HNMT).

Overview of diphenhydramine targets and effects
Biological target	Mode of action	Effect
H_{1} receptor	Inverse agonist	Allergy reduction; Sedation
mACh receptors	Antagonist	Anticholinergic; Antiparkinson
Sodium channels	Blocker	Local anesthetic

=== Pharmacokinetics ===
Oral bioavailability of diphenhydramine is in the range of 40% to 60%, and peak plasma concentration occurs about 2 to 3 hours after administration. Diphenhydramine, available in various salt forms, such as citrate, hydrochloride, and salicylate, exhibits distinct molecular weights and pharmacokinetic properties. Specifically, diphenhydramine hydrochloride and diphenhydramine citrate possess molecular weights of 291.8 g/mol and 447.5 g/mol, respectively. These variations in molecular weight influence the dissolution rates and absorption characteristics of each salt form.

The primary route of metabolism is two successive demethylations of the tertiary amine. The resulting primary amine is further oxidized to the carboxylic acid. Diphenhydramine is metabolized by the cytochrome P450 enzymes CYP2D6, CYP1A2, CYP2C9, and CYP2C19.

The elimination half-life of diphenhydramine has not been fully elucidated, but appears to range between 2.4 and 9.3 hours in healthy adults. A 1985 review of antihistamine pharmacokinetics found that the elimination half-life of diphenhydramine ranged between 3.4 and 9.3 hours across five studies, with a median elimination half-life of 4.3 hours. A subsequent 1990 study found that the elimination half-life of diphenhydramine was 5.4 hours in children, 9.2 hours in young adults, and 13.5 hours in the elderly. A 1998 study found a half-life of 4.1 ± 0.3 hours in young men, 7.4 ± 3.0 hours in elderly men, 4.4 ± 0.3 hours in young women, and 4.9 ± 0.6 hours in elderly women. In a 2018 study in children and adolescents, the half-life of diphenhydramine was 8 to 9 hours. In a 2009 study and review, diphenhydramine had a half-life of 4.3 to 9.3 hours across 7 studies.

== Chemistry ==
=== Detection in body fluids ===
Diphenhydramine can be quantified in blood, plasma, or serum. Gas chromatography with mass spectrometry (GC-MS) can be used with electron ionization on full scan mode as a screening test. GC-MS or GC-NDP can be used for quantification. Rapid urine drug screens using immunoassays based on the principle of competitive binding may show false-positive methadone results for people having ingested diphenhydramine. Quantification can be used to monitor therapy, confirm a diagnosis of poisoning in people who are hospitalized, provide evidence in an impaired driving arrest, or assist in a death investigation.

== History ==
In 1943, diphenhydramine was discovered by chemist George Rieveschl and one of his students, Fred Huber, while they were conducting research into muscle relaxants at the University of Cincinnati. Huber first synthesized diphenhydramine. Rieveschl then worked with Parke-Davis to test the compound, and the company licensed the patent from him. In 1946, it became the first prescription antihistamine in the United States approved by the FDA.

In the 1960s, diphenhydramine was found to weakly inhibit reuptake of the neurotransmitter serotonin. This discovery led to a search for viable antidepressants with similar structures and fewer side effects, culminating in the invention of fluoxetine (Prozac), a selective serotonin reuptake inhibitor (SSRI). A similar search had previously led to the synthesis of the first SSRI, zimelidine, from brompheniramine, also an antihistamine.

In 1975, diphenhydramine was still available only by prescription in the US and required medical supervision.

== Society and culture ==
=== Marketing ===
Diphenhydramine is sold under the brand name Benadryl by McNeil Consumer Healthcare in the US, UK, Canada, and South Africa. Trade names in other countries include Dimedrol, Daedalon, Nytol, and Vivinox. It is also available as a generic medication.

Procter & Gamble markets an over-the-counter formulation of diphenhydramine as a sleep aid under the brand ZzzQuil.

Prestige Brands markets an over-the-counter formulation of diphenhydramine as a sleep aid in the US under the name Sominex.

=== Cultural impact ===
Diphenhydramine is deemed to have limited abuse potential in the United States owing to its potentially serious side-effect profile and limited euphoric effects, and is not a controlled substance. Since 2002, the US FDA has required special labeling warning against the use of multiple products that contain diphenhydramine. In some jurisdictions, diphenhydramine is often present in postmortem specimens collected during investigation of sudden infant deaths; the drug may play a role in these events.

Diphenhydramine is among prohibited and controlled substances in the Republic of Zambia, and travelers are advised not to bring the drug into the country. Several Americans have been detained by the Zambian Drug Enforcement Commission for possession of Benadryl and other over-the-counter medications containing diphenhydramine.

==== Recreational use ====
Although diphenhydramine is widely used and generally considered to be safe for occasional usage, multiple cases of abuse and addiction have been documented. Because the drug is cheap and sold over the counter in most countries, adolescents without access to more sought-after illicit drugs are particularly at risk. People with mental health problems—especially those with schizophrenia—are also prone to abuse the drug, which may be self-administered in large doses to treat extrapyramidal symptoms caused by the use of antipsychotics.

Recreational users report calming effects, mild euphoria, and hallucinations as the desired effects of the drug. Research has shown that antimuscarinic agents, including diphenhydramine, "may have antidepressant and mood-elevating properties". A study conducted on adult males with a history of sedative abuse found that subjects who were administered a high dose (400 mg) of diphenhydramine reported a desire to take the drug again, despite also reporting negative effects, such as difficulty concentrating, confusion, tremors, and blurred vision.

In 2020, an Internet challenge emerged on the social media platform TikTok involving deliberately overdosing on diphenhydramine; dubbed the Benadryl challenge, the challenge encourages participants to consume dangerous amounts of Benadryl and to film the resultant behaviour and has been implicated in several hospitalisations and at least two deaths.

A shadow person entity reported to have been seen by people while under the effects of diphenhydramine, known as the "Hat Man", has become an internet meme and an urban legend.
