= GoDutch =

Dutch financial technology company

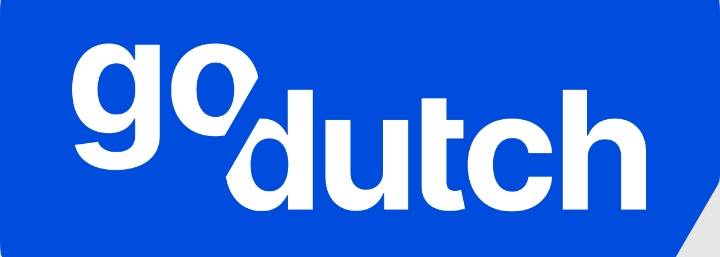
- Type: Private company bv
- Industry: Financial technology
- Founded: 2024
- Founder: Thomas Vles
- Headquarters: Amsterdam, Netherlands
- Area served: Netherlands
- Products: Payment services, digital payments
- Website: godutch.com

GoDutch is a Dutch financial technology company that provides business banking and financial account services. The company develops digital financial tools intended for businesses, including account management payments, and financial operations.

== History and services ==
GoDutch was founded in 2024 by Thomas Vles The company was established as a financial technology platform focused on digital banking solutions for businesses.

GoDutch operates a digital platform offering business accounts and financial management tools. It’s services are designed to support companies in managing financial operations, including payments, expense administration, and team-based financial workflows.

The platform includes features related to account infrastructure, payment cards, and integrations with accounting systems.

The company operates within the financial technology sector, particularly in the area of digital banking and business financial services. Its activities are associated for with broader developments in digital financial infrastructure and enterprise-focused financial technology solutions.

== Funding and operations ==
In May 2025, the company secured approximately €1.2 million in a pre-seed funding round. Investors included individuals associated with Dutch neobanks, including René Frijters and Mike de Boer of Knab, and Bart Wesselink, former chief operating officer and chief financial officer of bunq. In December 2025, GoDutch raised €3.6 million in a seed funding round led by Luxembourg Finance House, with participation from QuantumLeap Capital. As of December 2025, the company had approximately 12,500 active business users and more than €1.5 billion in processed payments, with a total customer base of over 20,000 users.
