= 8-Chlorotheophylline =

Chemical compound

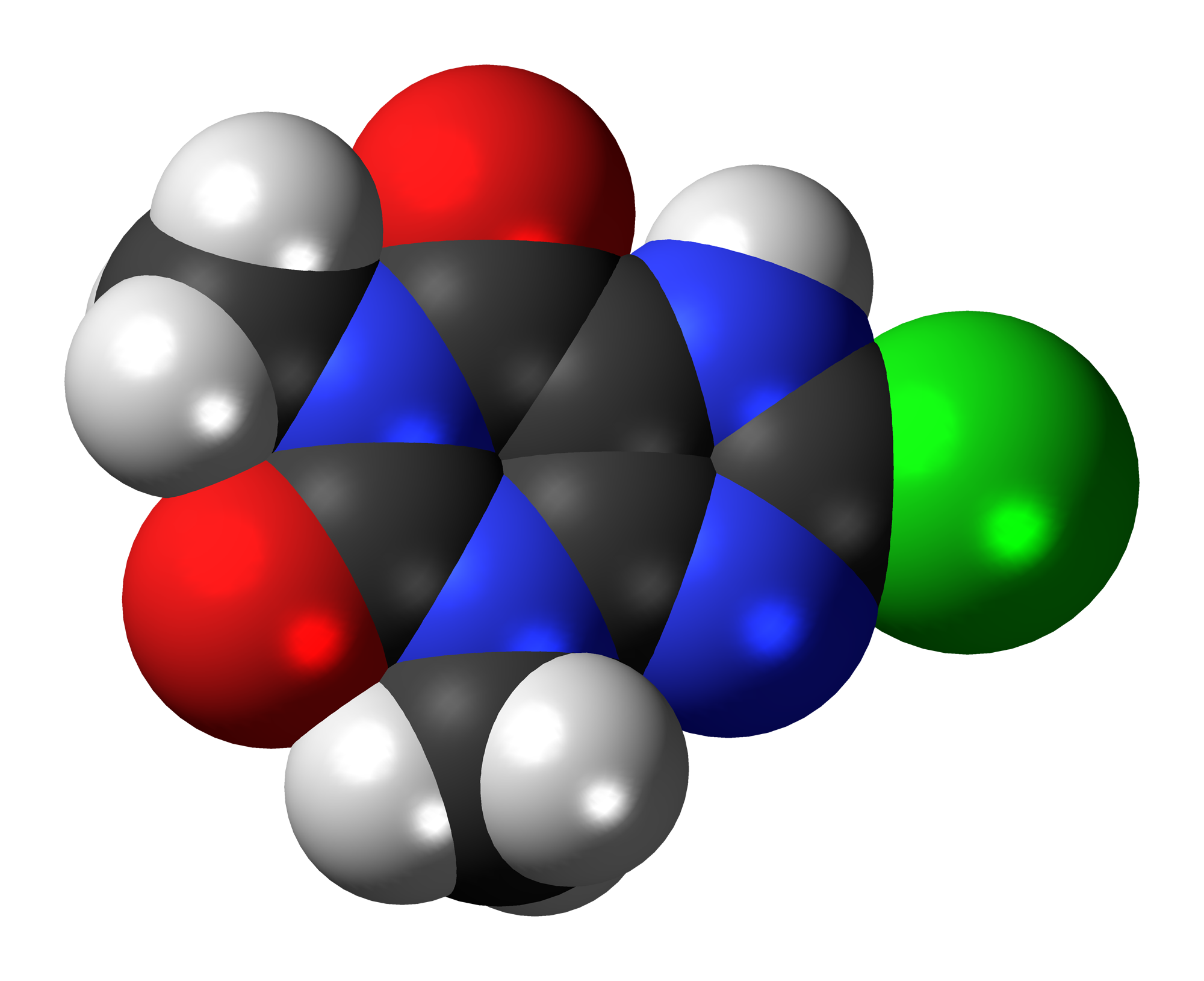

Clinical data
- Other names: 1,3-Dimethyl-8-chloroxanthine; Teoclate
- Routes of administration: Oral
- ATC code: none

Legal status
- Legal status: In general: Over-the-counter (OTC)

Identifiers
- IUPAC name: 8-chloro-1,3-dimethyl-7H-purine-2,6-dione
- CAS Number: 85-18-7
- PubChem CID: 10661
- ChemSpider: 10211
- UNII: GE2UA340FM
- ChEBI: CHEBI:59771
- ChEMBL: ChEMBL88611
- CompTox Dashboard (EPA): DTXSID5043764
- ECHA InfoCard: 100.001.446

Chemical and physical data
- Formula: C_{7}H_{7}ClN_{4}O_{2}
- Molar mass: 214.61 g·mol^{−1}
- 3D model (JSmol): Interactive image
- SMILES: Cn2c(=O)c1[nH]c(Cl)nc1n(C)c2=O
- InChI: InChI=1S/C7H7ClN4O2/c1-11-4-3(9-6(8)10-4)5(13)12(2)7(11)14/h1-2H3,(H,9,10); Key:RYIGNEOBDRVTHA-UHFFFAOYSA-N

8-Chlorotheophylline, also known as 1,3-dimethyl-8-chloroxanthine, is a stimulant drug of the xanthine chemical class, with physiological effects similar to caffeine. Its main use is in combination (salt) with diphenhydramine in the antiemetic dimenhydrinate (Dramamine). Diphenhydramine reduces nausea but causes drowsiness, and the stimulant properties of 8-chlorotheophylline help reduce that side effect.

Despite being classified as a xanthine stimulant, 8-chlorotheophylline generally does not produce any hyperlocomotion above control in mice and does not appear to cross the blood–brain barrier well.

The 8-chloro modification was not selected for pharmacological properties; instead, it was to raise the acidity of the xanthine amine group enough to form a co-salt with diphenhydramine.

The drug is also sold in combination with promethazine as a salt.
