= Yaupon tea =

Beverage made from yaupon holly

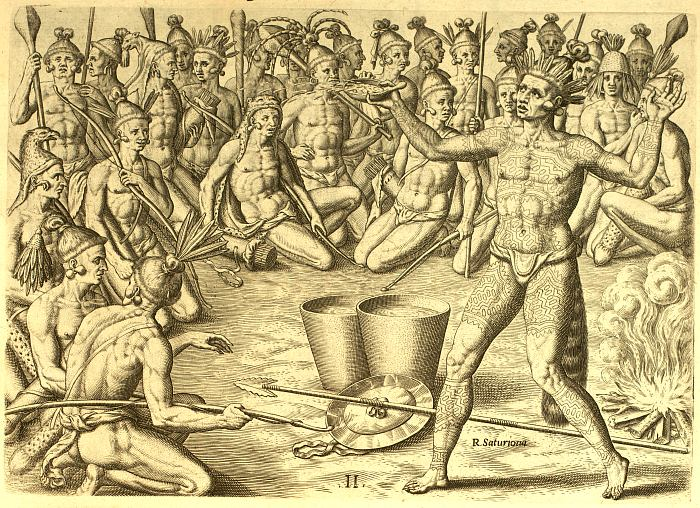
The Timucua chief Saturiwa (fl. 1562–1565) prepares his men for battle by drinking yaupon tea. Engraving by Jacques le Moyne and Theodor de Bry.

Yaupon tea (also known as "beloved drink", "cassina", "big medicine", or "white drink", "black drink", "Carolina tea", "South Seas tea", or "Indian tea" by Europeans) is any of several kinds of caffeinated beverages originally brewed by Native Americans in the Southeastern United States and later adopted by Europeans and European Americans. It is generally brewed from yaupon holly (Ilex vomitoria), which is native to the Atlantic and Gulf Coasts, and is related to yerba mate (Ilex paraguariensis) and guayusa. Historical versions of drink may also have included the related dahoon holly (Ilex cassine) and other herbs.

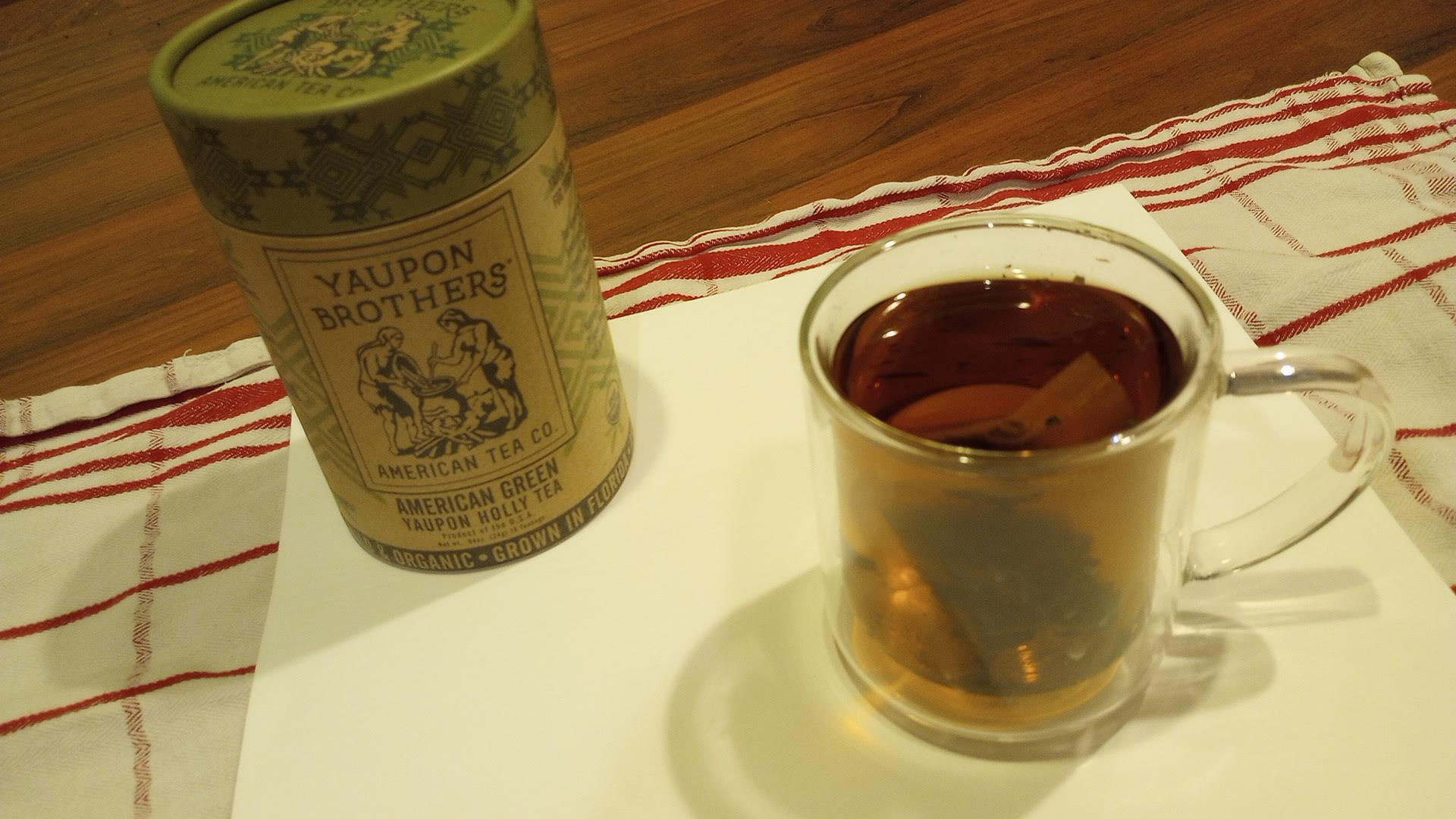
A cup of American yaupon tea commercially available in the United States

A highly concentrated yaupon beverage was used in various rituals, including purification ceremonies, by Yuchi, Caddo, Chickasaw, Cherokee, Choctaw, Muscogee, Timucua, Chitimacha and other Indigenous peoples of the Southeastern Woodlands such as the Quapaw. Jean-Bernard Bossu describes being served cassine in a gourd by the Akansas (Quapaw) during a ceremonial meal. Furthermore, other Native groups who did not live within the natural range of yaupon traded for it or cultivated it. Its use in the ancient Mississippian metropolis of Cahokia has also been confirmed. Native peoples used yaupon tea as a social drink in council meetings and it was offered to guests as a hospitable drink. They also used it as a medicinal tea. It was also drunk as a daily energizing drink, and a strong version of it was drunk by men before battle. It was known by various names, including "white drink" (due to its associations with purity), "beloved drink" (the plant being known as the "beloved tree"), as well as "black drink" (mostly by Europeans, due to the color of the strong brew).

The preparation and protocols vary between tribes and ceremonial grounds; a prominent ingredient is the roasted leaves and stems of Ilex vomitoria. In some contexts, the yaupon drink was made in a highly concentrated form that may have contained other herbs which may have had emetic properties. Fasting before ceremonies, along with excessive consumption of large quantities of the drink may have also caused the vomiting which was observed by Europeans. These observations led to the association of the drink with vomiting, and also to its modern scientific name, even though the yaupon leaf has no inherent emetic properties. According to the USDA, "modern chemical analysis of yaupon has found no emetic or toxic compounds, and caffeine concentrations are similar to many commercially marketed teas."

Yaupon tea was adopted by European colonists (initially the Spanish in Florida) as early as the 17th century, who drank it as a normal caffeinated beverage. It continued to be used by White Americans living in the American South, especially in the Carolinas. Its use mostly died out in the early 20th century, but the drink saw renewed popularity in the 21st century. Yaupon tea also continues to be used by various Native American tribes, like the Seminoles, who make a black drink for their annual Green Corn Ceremony (however, the drink does not always contain yaupon, since it is a blend of various plants).

== Chemical composition ==
Ilex vomitoria leaves contain active ingredients such as caffeine, theobromine, ursolic acid, and theophylline, just like the related yerba mate and guayusa hollies. Ilex vomitoria has a ratio of caffeine to theobromine of about 5:1. In comparison, T. cacao may contain a ratio from 1:4 to 1:7.

The leaves contain 0.0038 to 0.2288 percent caffeine by weight according to experiments performed by Adam Edwards in 2002. In comparison, Owen gives the caffeine content of coffee as between 1.01 and 1.42 percent. The combination of a lower caffeine content with theobromine, and theophylline can provide alertness without jitteriness and the caffeine crash.

Furthermore, the Ilex vomitoria has been found to be high in the following antioxidant and anti-inflammatory polyphenols: chlorogenic acid, rutin, neochlorogenic acid and cryptochlorogenic acid. It also contains theacrine, quercetin and saponins. A study by the University of Florida of the yaupon cultivar "Nana" found that the plant contained as much antioxidant potential as blueberries.

The leaves of the yaupon holly also contain little to no tannins, which means that the tea has neither bitterness nor astringency. As such, over-steeping the leaves will not make a bitter brew.

== Harvesting and preparation ==
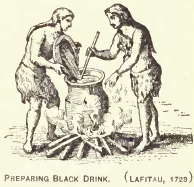
Preparing Black Drink, engraving by Joseph-François Lafitau, 1723

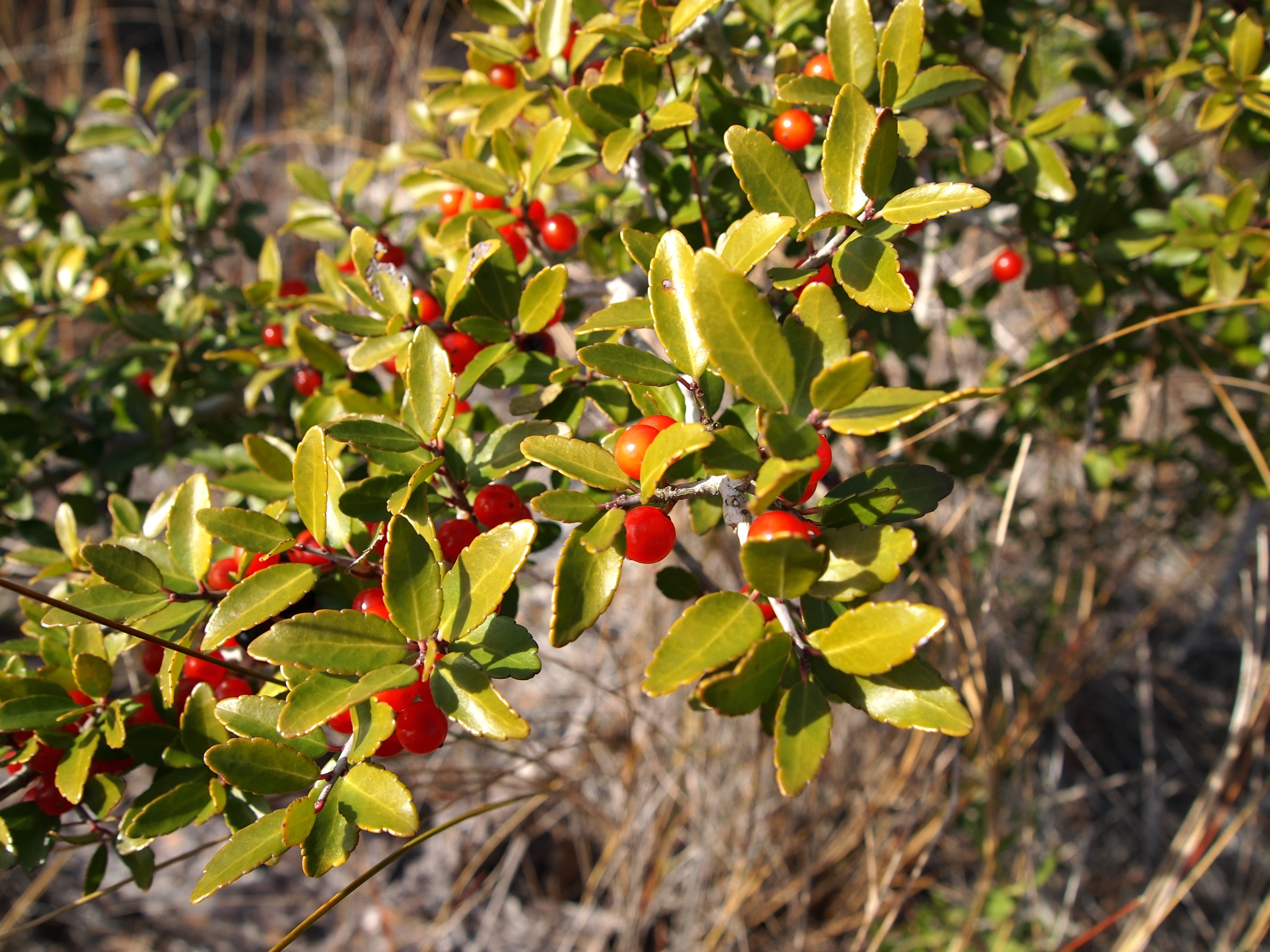
Yaupon holly

According to the ethnohistorical record, the yaupon leaves and branches used for the "beloved drink" were traditionally picked as close to the time of its planned consumption as possible. After picking, historically they were lightly parched in a ceramic container over fire. The roasting increases the solubility in water of the caffeine, which is the same reason coffee beans are roasted.

Afterwards, the leaves were boiled in large containers of water until the liquid reached a dark brown or black color (hence the name "black drink"). The liquid was then strained into containers to cool, until it was cool enough to not scald the skin, and drunk while still hot. Because caffeine is 30 times more soluble in boiling water than room temperature water, this heightened its effect. It was then consumed in a ritual manner. Its physiological effects are believed to be mainly those of massive doses of caffeine. Yaupon tea has a higher concentration of caffeine than strong coffee.

The general method of production is known, but not all details of the preparation and ceremonial usage of the black drink are. The source of the emetic effect of black drink is not known and has been speculated upon by historians, archaeologists, and botanists. Some professionals believe it to be caused by the addition of the poisonous Eryngium yuccifolium.

European colonists adopted the production of the yaupon leaves from the Native peoples and made an infusion which they called by various names including yaupon tea, Indian tea, Carolina tea, South Seas tea or Appalachia tea.

Contemporary preparation and usage of the yaupon drink by Native Americans is less well documented. Online recipes for the brew have been criticized by some Native Americans as potentially dangerous and potentially poisonous due to those recipes leaving out key steps. The berries of the yaupon holly are poisonous. They can lead to kidney failure and should not be consumed. Adam Edwards and Bradley Bennett tested stems, roots, and leaves of the yaupon. They found that the only possible toxic substance was theobromine, an alkaloid, but the amounts of the chemical were so low that a single gram of cocoa contained over 2,255 times more theobromine than yaupon.

== Archaeological accounts ==
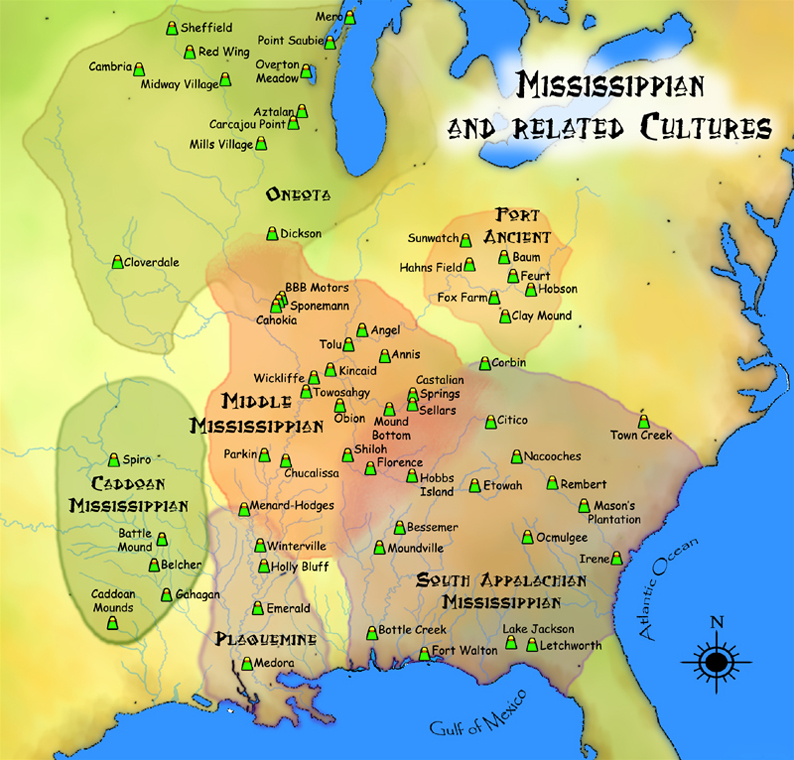
Approximate areas of various Mississippian and related cultures

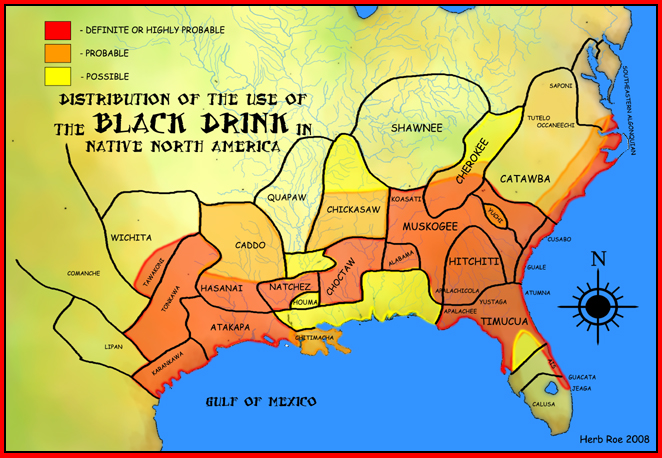
Map of the geographical extent of black drink use by Indigenous peoples of the Southeastern Woodlands prior to 19th century Indian removal

Archaeologists have demonstrated the use of various kinds of "beloved drink" among Native American groups stretching back far into antiquity, possibly dating to Late Archaic times (8000 to 1000 BCE). During the Hopewell period (100 BCE to 500 CE), the shell cups known from later black drink rituals become common in high-status burials along with mortuary pottery and engraved stone and copper tablets. The significance of the shell cups may indicate the beginning of black drink ceremonialism. The fact that both the shells and the yaupon holly come from the same geographical location may indicate they were traded together in the Hopewell Interaction Sphere. The appearance of shell cups can be used as a virtual marker for the advent of Hopewell culture in many instances. During the Mississippian culture period (800–1600 CE), the presence of items associated with the black drink ceremony had spread over most of the south, with many examples from the polities of Cahokia, Etowah, Spiro, and Moundville.

=== Black drink at Cahokia ===
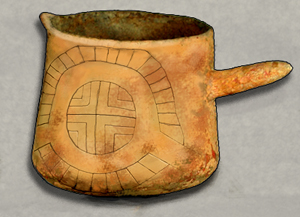
Ceramic beaker from Cahokia with woodhenge motif

Archaeologists working at Cahokia, the largest Mississippian culture settlement located near the modern city of St. Louis, found distinctive and relatively rare pottery beakers dating from 1050 to 1250 CE. The beakers are small round pots with a handle on one side and a tiny lip on the opposing side. The surfaces of the unfired vessels was incised with motifs representing water and the underworld and resemble the whelk shells known to have been used for the consumption of the beverage during historic times. The inside of the vessels were found to be coated with a plant residue, which when tested was found to contain theobromine, caffeine and ursolic acid in the right proportions to have come from the Ilex vomitoria.

The presence of the black drink in the Greater Cahokia area at this early date pushes back the definitive use of the black drink by several centuries. The presence of the black drink hundreds of miles outside of its natural range on the East and Gulf coasts is evidence of a substantial trade network with the southeast, a trade that also involved sharks teeth and whelk shells. This is confirmed by historical accounts. John Brickell's Natural History of North Carolina (1737), states that the indigenous peoples of the North Carolina coast "frequently carry it [yaupon] to the Westward Indians, who give Deer Skins, and other Necessaries they want for."

=== Shell cups ===
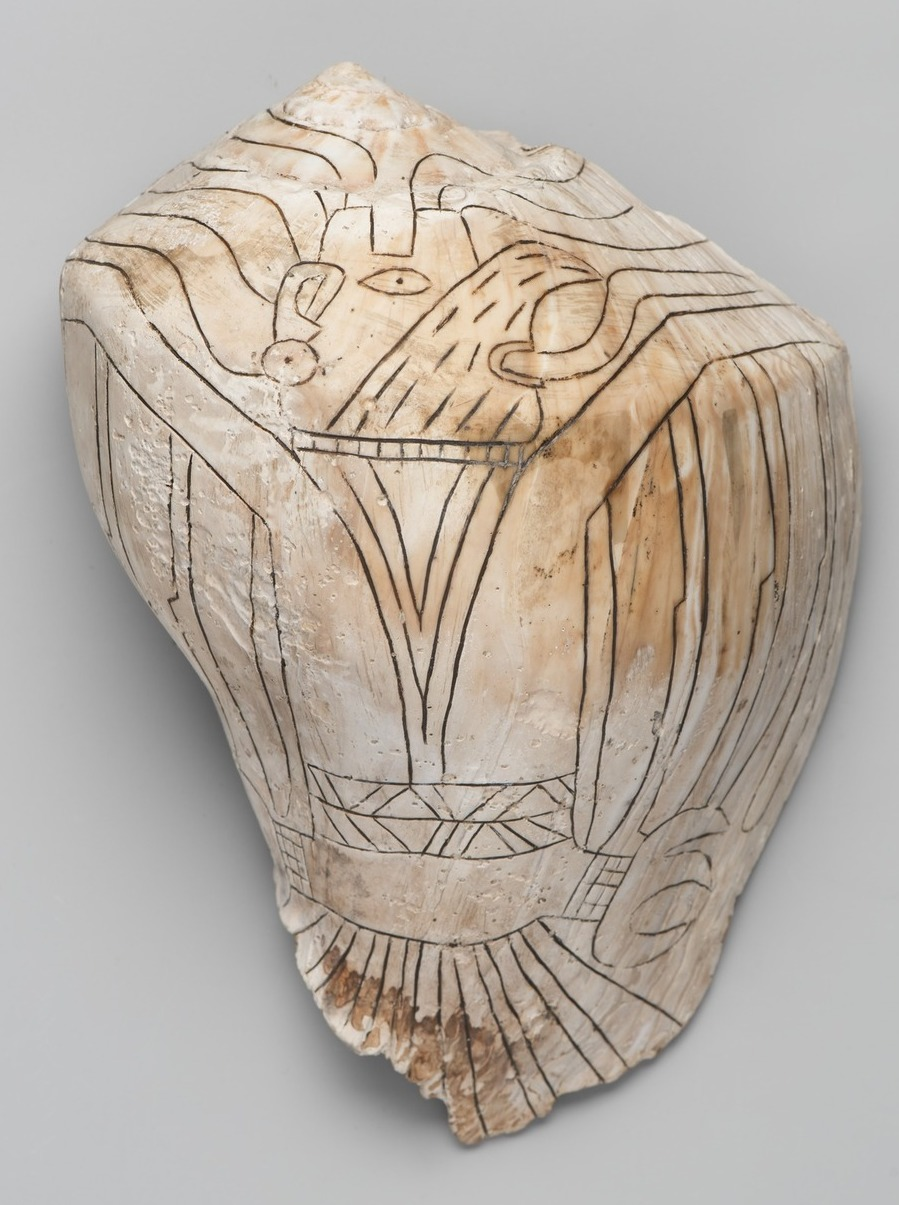
Falcon warrior shell cup, from the Spiro Mounds, eastern Oklahoma

In historic accounts from the 16th and 17th century, the black drink is usually imbibed in rituals using a cup made of marine shell. Three main species of marine shells have been identified as being used as cups for the black drink, lightning whelk, emperor helmet, and the horse conch. The most common was the lightning whelk, which has a left-handed or sinistral spiral. The left-handed spiral may have held religious significance because of its association with dance and ritual. The center columnella, which runs longitudinally down the shell, would be removed, and the rough edges sanded down to make a dipper-like cup. The columnella would then be used as a pendant, a motif that shows up frequently in Southeastern Ceremonial Complex (S.E.C.C.) designs. In the archaeological record columnella pendants are usually found in conjunction with bi-lobed arrows, stone maces, earspools, and necklace beads (all of which are motifs identified with the falcon dancer/warrior/chunkey player mythological figure).

Artifacts made from these marine shells have been found as far north as Wisconsin and as far west as Oklahoma. Several examples of cups from Moundville and Spiro have been found to have rings of black residue in the bottoms, suggesting they were used for black drink rituals. Many examples of shell cups found in Mississippian culture mounds are engraved with S.E.C.C. imagery. A few examples portray what is theorized to be black drink rituals, including what some anthropologists have interpreted as vomit issuing from the mouths of mythological beings.

=== US Southwest and Mexican Northwest ===
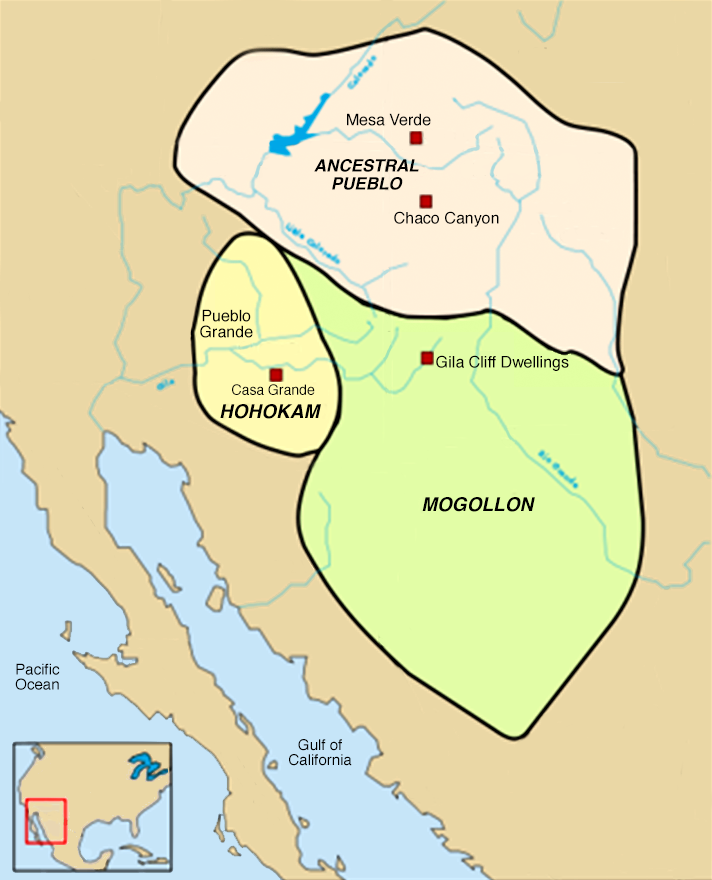
Map of Ancestral Pueblo culture and neighboring cultures: Hohokam and Mogollon

Pottery samples recovered from sites in modern Southwestern United States and Northwestern Mexico associated with Ancestral Puebloan, Mogollon and Hohokam cultures have tested positive for the ratio of methylxanthines associated with those produced by Ilex vomitoria. The same study also identified methylxanthines ratios associated with Theobroma cacao. Neither plants are native to the areas from which the pottery samples were recovered, which suggests trading between areas where those plants are native. The samples were recovered from 18 sites in Arizona, Chihuahua, Colorado, and New Mexico, including Pueblo Bonito in Chaco Canyon New Mexico and Grasshopper Pueblo in Arizona. The study "reveals widespread use of two different caffeinated plants, cacao and holly, as the basis for drinks used in communal, ritual gatherings" by "at least A.D. 1000".

The chemical analysis also suggests a possible increase in drinks prepared from cacao after the year 1200, and a decrease in the use of drinks prepared from Ilex vomitoria. Freshwater shells from Texas and Arkansas have been recovered from Pueblo Bonito, which have been used as possible evidence for the trade of Ilex vomitoria from the east. There are also some stands of Ilex vomitoria in Mesoamerica, so the exact origins of the Ilex vomitoria used to prepare the drinks is currently unknown.

== Historical accounts of Native use ==
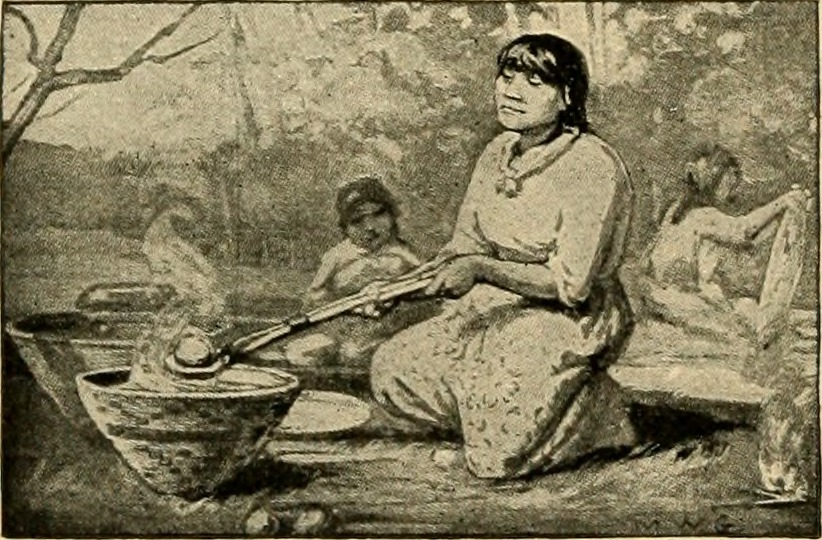
"Stone boiling", a Native method of making infusions and soups

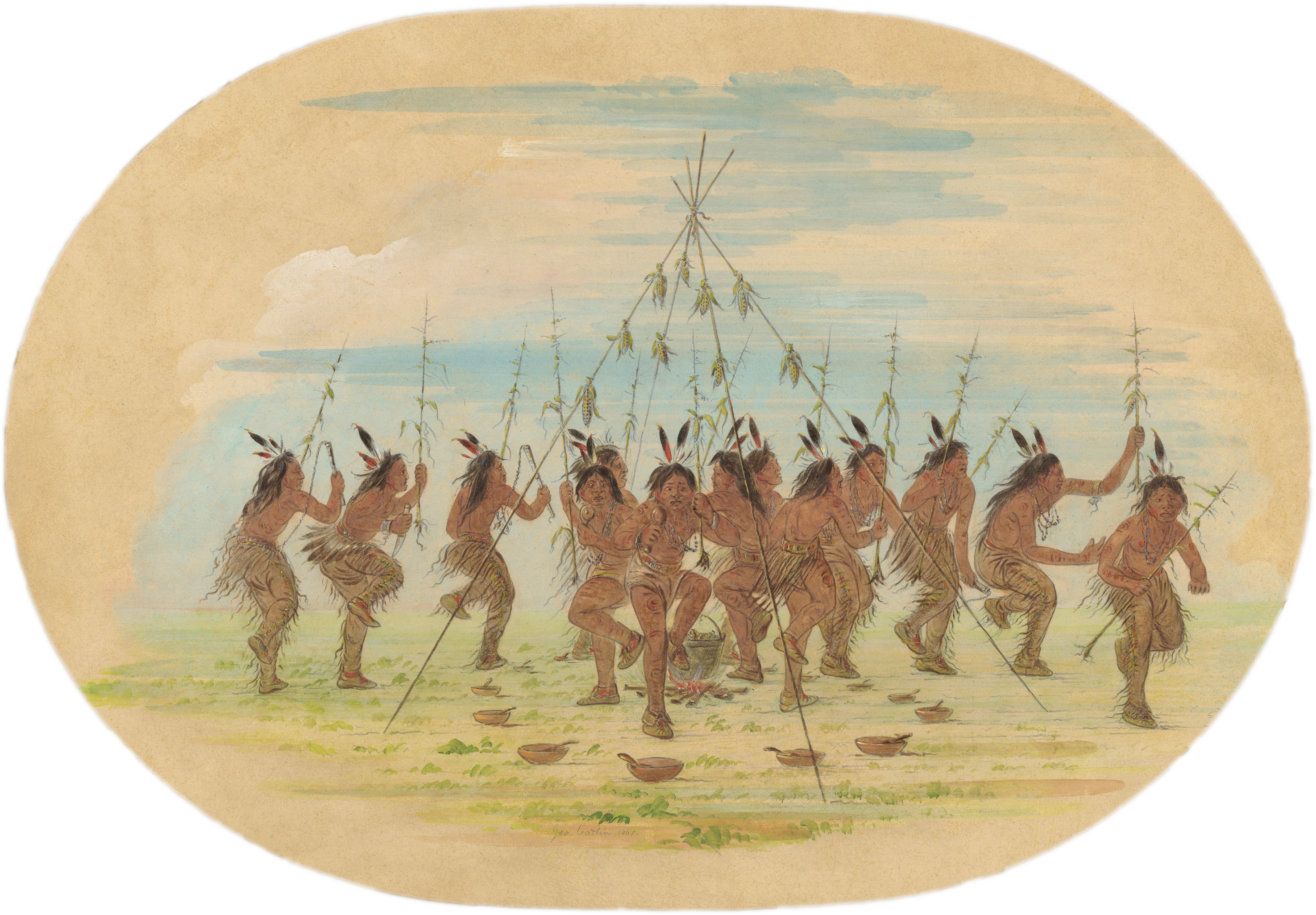
Green Corn Dance, George Catlin, 1861

Several tribes across the Southeastern United States use a form of the beloved drink in their ceremonies. Muscogee Creeks, Cherokees, Choctaws, Ais, Guale, Chickasaws, Chitimacha, Timucua, and others are documented users of a type of black drink in various rituals and ceremonies, including rites specifically focused on the drinking of the infusion, often accompanied by singing. It was also commonly drunk in the various Green Corn Ceremonies held by numerous Native groups as well as used before Native American ball games.

Although rituals vary amongst the different tribes, there are some common traits among them. Black drink was most commonly drunk by men, who also prepare it, but there are some accounts of its preparation and use by women among some groups. Some of these rituals included ritual vomiting, associated with purification. The removal of tribes to areas outside the natural range of Ilex vomitoria has been partially responsible for a decline in the preparation of the black drink among present Native Americans.

The various Native groups also used yaupon drinks outside of ritual ceremonial contexts. They drank it daily as a social drink, especially among men in council meetings. They also drank it as an energizing brew before combat or work. They also used it as medicine to heal wounds, calm nerves, suppress appetite, and regulate menstrual cycles. They even used it to induce dreams.

=== Ais ===
In 1696, Jonathan Dickinson witnessed the use of a beverage brewed from the Yaupon Holly among the Ais of Florida. Dickinson later learned that the Spanish called the plant casseena. The Ais parched the leaves in a pot, and then boiled them. The resulting liquid was then transferred to a large bowl using a gourd that had a long neck with a small hole at the top, and a 2-inch-wide (51 mm) hole in the side. On the occasion Dickinson witnessed, he estimated that there were nearly three gallons of the beverage in the bowl. After the liquid had cooled, the chief was presented with a conch-shell of the beverage. The chief threw part of it on the ground as a blessing and drank the rest. The chief's associates were then served in turn. Lower status men, women, and children were not allowed to touch or taste the beverage. The chief and his associates sat drinking this brew, smoking and talking for most of the day. In the evening, the bowl that had held the beverage was covered with a skin to make a drum. The Ais, accompanied by the drum and some rattles, sang and danced until the middle of the night.

=== Alabama ===
The Alabama people also used the yaupon drink in their assemblies. They also used it as a peace offering, offering it to their enemies when calling for peace.

=== Apalache ===
The Apalache tribe drank yaupon tea in preparation for their ballgame. Preparations included magic, fasting, dancing as well as pouring a yaupon tea libation on the ground and ritually drinking the yaupon drink.

=== Cherokee ===
The Cherokee yaupon drink was taken for purification purposes at several traditional ceremonies and in preparation for any event in which ritual purification was needed. According to William L. Merrill, "he Cherokees employed emetic decoctions in a number of contexts, perhaps the most notable of these being their green corn ceremonies, rituals preceding and following raiding expeditions, during ceremonies, and ceremonies performed prior to playing a ballgame."

Ilex vomitoria was not native to the traditional area controlled by the Cherokee before removal, but it was brought in to the area through trade and then transplanted.

=== Muscogee ===
Among the Muscogee the black drink is called ássi. In the ceremonies of some cultures that use the drink, after its preparation it is passed out to the highest-status person first, then the next highest status, and so forth. During each person's turn to drink, ritual songs may be sung. Its use was traditionally limited to only adult men. The ritual name Asi Yahola or Black Drink Singer is corrupted into English as Osceola).

Among the tribes of the Muscogee Creek confederacy, yaupon was consumed in ceremonial purification rites as well as in highly formal meetings. Furthermore, several writers on the topic state that men in Creek towns gathered daily in the town center or council houses to discuss key matters and partake of the yaupon drink. The Creeks also offered yaupon beverages to friendly visitors to indicate their hospitable intentions.

=== Seminoles ===
The Seminoles also drank yaupon beverages. The famous Seminole warrior Osceola was named after the drink. His Seminole name is actually Asi Yahola, "Black Drink Singer", indicating that he was involved in a yaupon drink ceremony that involved singing. Yaupon drink ceremonialism continued among the Seminoles even after their removal into reservations. It is still practiced by some Seminoles, though these ceremonies are closed to the public.

=== Timucua ===
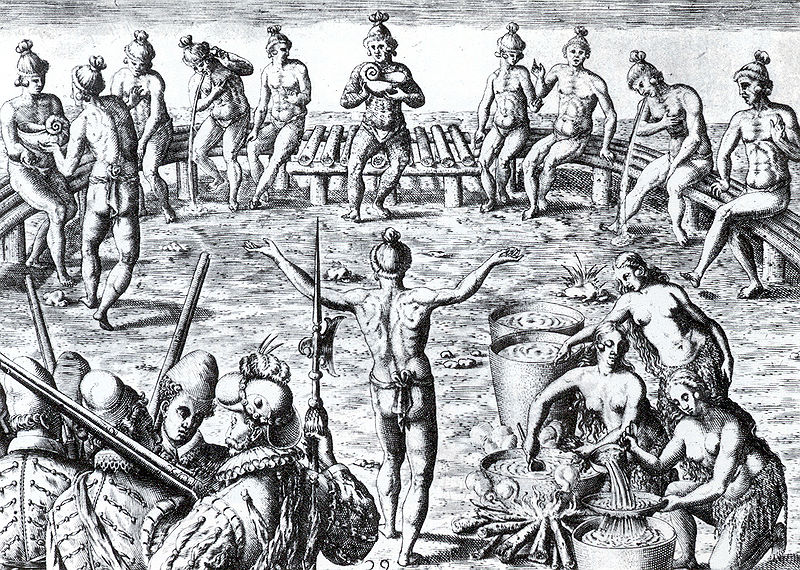
16th-century engraving by Jacques le Moyne of a Timucua ceremony involving the black drink

Among the Timucua, a type of black drink was called cacina by the Spanish and spelled casino in Pareja's Timucua writings. The preparation and consumption of the drink were strictly limited to the community council house. Women (other than an occasional female chief) were normally excluded from the council house except for activities such as dances, but did prepare the cacina. In 1678 a bedridden cacica (a female chief) was given permission to brew and consume cacina in her house, on the condition that no one else could be present while she did so. The first sip of the black drink was called in Timucua casinomucu "eye of cacina". The Timucua use of yaupon tea was also discussed by French explorers to Florida, who explained how it was used in purification ceremonies as an emetic by the men, with the tribal chief drinking first, and then the warriors.

== Historical use by European Americans ==
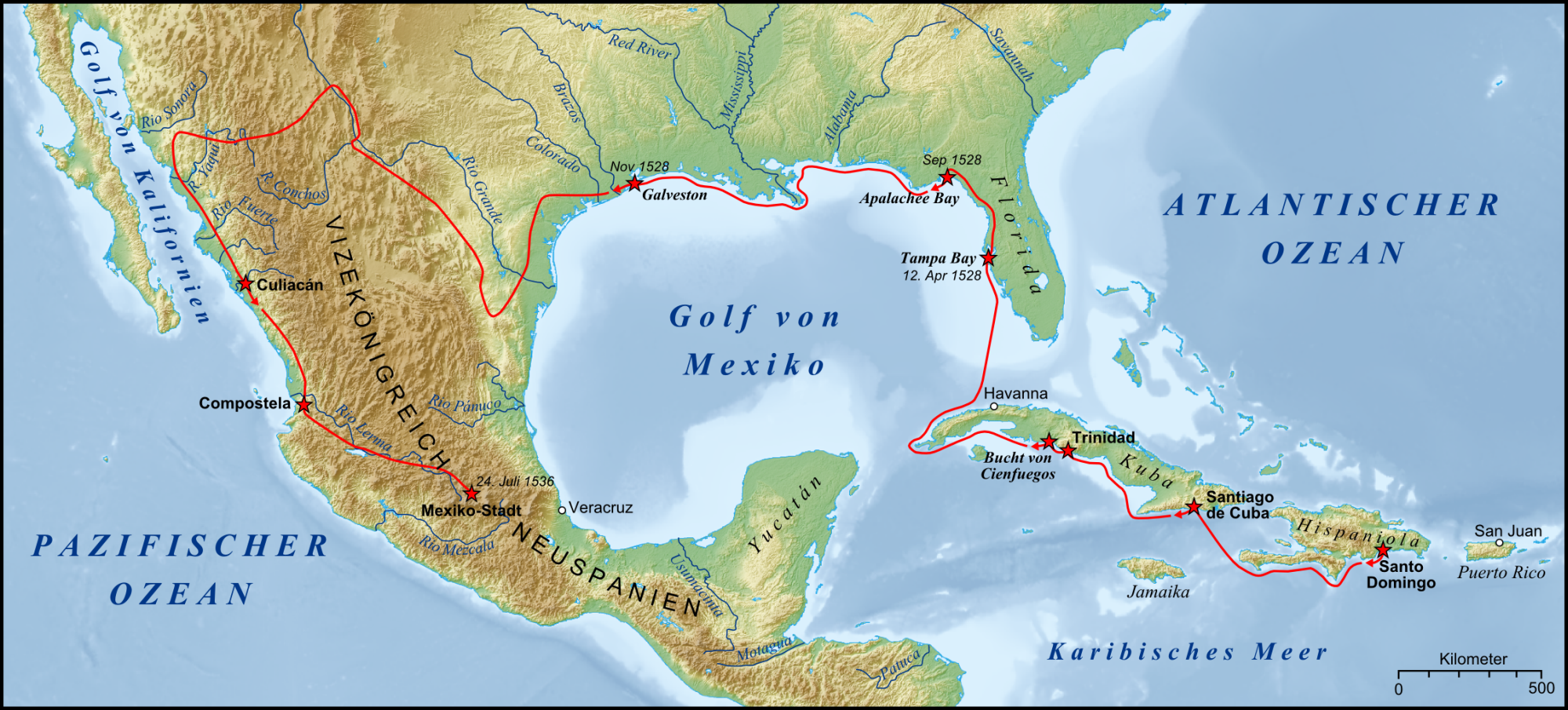
Route of Narváez expedition (until November 1528), and speculative historical reconstruction of Cabeza de Vaca's later wanderings, where he observed yaupon drinking among the Native peoples of the Gulf coast

After European contact with tribes in what is today the Southeastern United States, colonists began using the roasted leaves of the yaupon holly to make a tea similar to the Native beverage for daily drinking (not for ritual use). It was first discussed by the 16th century Spanish explorer Álvar Núñez Cabeza de Vaca in his La relación who writes of its use in ritual purification ceremonies:

They [Natives] drink there another thing that they make from the leaves of trees like that of the holly oak. ... And that which they have drunk, they throw up, which they do very easily and without any shame.

Its use by Spanish colonists in settlements of Spanish Florida (such as Saint Augustine) is documented as far back as 1615, when a Spanish priest wrote "there is no Spaniard or Indian who does not drink it every day in the morning or evening". An account from that year by botanist Francisco Ximenez describes Spaniards as experiencing symptoms that would now be described as caffeine dependence due to daily consumption of what they called cacina or té del indio.

The use of Ilex vomitoria by colonists for tea making and for medicinal uses in the Carolinas is documented by the early eighteenth century. In the English-speaking colonies, it was known variously as cassina, yaupon tea, Indian tea, Carolina tea, and Appalachian tea. It was commonly believed to be and used as a diuretic. By the late 1700s, yaupon tea was described as being more commonly used in North Carolina at breakfast than tea made with Camellia sinensis. In addition to using it on their own, European colonists often consumed yaupon tea when engaging in discussions and treaties with Natives. Its preparation by European colonists was nearly identical to the method of preparation used by their Native neighbors. Its consumption by colonists in French Louisiana is speculated to have occurred, but lacks documentation other than one source describing its medicinal uses from 1716.

Charles Hudson writes that by the American Revolutionary War (1775–1783), yaupon was being grown on colonial farms, and was consumed widely in towns across the Southern American colonies. During the American revolutionary era there was a patriotic backlash against British tea, in part caused by the Tea Act (1773). The anti-tea campaign boycotted British tea and promoted local herbal teas, like Yaupon and Labrador tea, which they called liberty teas. Yaupon was also drunk by the Spanish, as a French writer states "The Spaniards make great use of it over all Florida: it is even their ordinary drink." According to Southern American sources, prior to the U.S. Civil War "nearly every plantation and farm ha[d] what is termed a yopon nursery".

Yaupon tea was not just popular in the North American South, it was also traded and drunk in Europe, including in Paris and London. In Europe, the tea was known as Carolina tea or South Seas Tea in London and as Apalachine in Paris. It was also promoted as a medicinal tea. In the 18th century, the German botanist Johann David Schöpf wrote in his diaries that the alternative American tea had become so popular that the British East India Company saw it as a threat to its tea trade. This led England to limit yaupon imports. It was at this time that the Scottish botanist William Aiton gave yaupon its controversial scientific name, Ilex vomitoria. While this name may have reflected its ritual consumption among Native Americans, some (like Florida applied ecologist Francis Putz) believe that this name was also a way to smear yaupon and lessen its impact on the English tea trade. The scientific name of the plant continued to be debated well into the 20th century and the European confusion about its falsely attributed emetic properties continued well into the 19th century.

During the Civil War (1861–1865), yaupon tea was used as a substitute for coffee and tea throughout the South, since their supply had been cut off by the Union blockade. Yaupon continued to be used in North Carolina for medicinal purposes and as a common drink until the late 1890s. The Carolinas had a thriving yaupon tea industry in the 19th century. At the turn of the century, its use was stigmatized because of its associations as a habit of rural people who were too poor to afford coffee and tea. According to Charles M. Hudson "Cassina [yaupon] was so abundant on the coast that it could be drunk by the poor; hence it became déclassé." Furthermore, the tea became associated with poor American southern blacks, who also adopted it from indigenous people, drank the tea widely and used it as a folk medicine. As such, whites began to avoid yaupon due to its class and racial associations.

By 1928 it was described as only being in common use on Knotts Island, North Carolina. During the Interwar period (1918–1939) the United States Department of Agriculture investigated the use of cassina tea as an economical substitute for coffee and tea and they even tested yaupon drinks at the Charleston County Fair. There were also a few attempts at the commercialization of cassina tea during that same period. By 1973 it was believed that cassina tea was only being served at the Pony Island Restaurant on Ocracoke Island, North Carolina.

== Contemporary status ==
In the early 2000s, yaupon tea began witnessing a resurgence in its popularity with small new startup firms in Florida, Georgia, and Texas harvesting and processing yaupon tea.

Various American brands of Yaupon tea can now be purchased in several local marketplaces, online and at several historical sites related to Native Americans. These small firms market yaupon tea as an organic, locally sourced, ethically harvested and environmentally conscious caffeinated drink. Demand for the drink has increased recently and in 2018 the American Yaupon Association was formed to promote yaupon. According to Folch "much of the yaupon sold by U.S.-based companies is organic—it is a popular hedge partly because it is endemic and requires no fertilizers, herbicides, or pesticides and little to no watering—and is foraged or grown in small plots (even in Central Florida's backyards)."

Yaupon tea is now carried by Whole Foods, who has promoted it as one of the top new food trends of 2023. It is also now sold as a fermented kombucha like beverage and in a powdered (matcha style) form.

According to BBC reporter Matt Stirn, yaupon tea brews as "a yellow to dark-orange elixir with a fruity and earthy aroma and a smooth flavour with malty tones" and its "ratio of stimulating xanthines such as caffeine, theobromine and theophylline release slowly into the body, providing a jitter-free mental clarity and an ease to the stomach."

There are various commercial cultivars of yaupon available from nurseries and commercial growers, including: 'Folsom Weeping', Grey's Little Leaf, 'Jewel', 'Nana', 'Pendula' 'Poole's Best', 'Pride of Houston', 'Shadow's Female', 'Shillings/Stokes Dwarf', 'Straughn's', 'Yawkey', and 'Yellow Berry'.

Due to the current environmental damage associated with other caffeine crops like coffee, a recent study by American botanists has promoted the use of local caffeine crops, like yaupon, as a more sustainable and environmentally friendly caffeine crop. Yaupon tea is expected to see increased demand in the United States in the 2020s due to tariffs placed by the United States government on tea and coffee imports.

Yaupon tea also continues to be used by some Native American tribes, like the Seminoles and the Cherokee.

== See also ==
- Ilex cassine, Dahoon holly or cassena, sometimes used in black drink
- Ilex guayusa, another holly species used to make herbal tea popular in Ecuador
- Yerba mate, Ilex paraguariensis, used to make the South American Mate drink
- Kuding (Chinese bitter nail tea), made from Ilex kaushue
- Mississippian culture
- Native American cuisine
- Southeastern Ceremonial Complex
- American tea culture
