= D9-Caffeine =

Deuterium-substituted isotopologue of caffeine

d9-Caffeine

Names
- IUPAC name 1,3,7-Tris(trideuteriomethyl)purine-2,6-dione
- Other names Caffeine-d9

Identifiers
CAS Number	72238-85-8
3D model (JSmol)	Interactive image
ChEBI	CHEBI:177330
ChemSpider	23935581
ECHA InfoCard	100.189.601
EC Number	663-277-2
PubChem CID	13001304
CompTox Dashboard (EPA)	DTXSID70514760
- InChI: InChI=1S/C8H10N4O2/c1-10-4-9-6-5(10)7(13)12(3)8(14)11(6)2/h4H,1-3H3/i1D3,2D3,3D3 Key: RYYVLZVUVIJVGH-GQALSZNTSA-N
- SMILES: [2H]C([2H])([2H])N1C=NC2=C1C(=O)N(C(=O)N2C([2H])([2H])[2H])C([2H])([2H])[2H]

Properties
Chemical formula	C_{8}HD_{9}N_{4}O_{2}
Molar mass	203.25 g mol^{−1}
- Except where otherwise noted, data are given for materials in their standard state (at 25 °C [77 °F], 100 kPa). Infobox references

d9-Caffeine is a deuterium-substituted isotopologue of caffeine. It shares identical chemical and structural properties with conventional caffeine, except for the substitution of all of its hydrogen atoms with deuterium, a naturally occurring, non-toxic, stable, heavy isotope of hydrogen. Specifically, in d9-caffeine, the nine hydrogens contained in the three methyl groups of conventional caffeine have been replaced with deuterium.

d9-Caffeine shares the xanthine backbone structure of conventional caffeine and belongs to the methylxanthine group of alkaloid compounds. It retains the physiological characteristics of caffeine as a central nervous system stimulant. However, the presence of deuterium in the methyl groups alters its pharmacokinetics, rendering it less susceptible to the typical metabolic pathways that quickly metabolize conventional caffeine into its active metabolites.

== Synthesis ==
Deuterium, also known as hydrogen-2, ^{2}H, or heavy hydrogen, is a stable, naturally occurring non-radioactive isotope of hydrogen. Deuteration, also referred to as deuterium enrichment, involves the substitution of hydrogen atoms with deuterium within a molecule. In d9-caffeine, deuterium is introduced into each of the three methyl groups, which are then integrated into the xanthine backbone at positions 1, 3, and 7 (resulting in 1, 3, 7-trideuteriomethyl xanthine-d9). This process yields a deuterated variant that maintains the identical structure and physiochemical properties of conventional caffeine but with altered pharmacokinetics.

== Early history ==
Deuterated forms of caffeine, including d9-caffeine, have been historically used as analytical reference standards in tandem liquid chromatography/mass spectrometry detection systems to detect and quantify the presence of caffeine. Owing to its structural and physiochemical similarities, d9-caffeine elutes in a liquid chromatography system at the same rate as conventional caffeine but can be differentiated from caffeine via mass spectrometry due to its slightly higher molecular weight.

The kinetic isotopic effect of substitution of deuterium for hydrogen within the caffeine molecule and its potential role in altering caffeine’s pharmacokinetics was first described by Horning et al., which demonstrated d9-caffeine to have a prolonged half-life in rodents relative to regular caffeine. Subsequent in vitro experiments with rat hepatocytes demonstrated that deuterium substitution of caffeine can result in significant shunting to or away from various downstream metabolites of caffeine depending on the deuterium placement, with d9-caffeine showing the most pronounced effect.

== Pharmacokinetics: metabolism ==
d9-Caffeine exhibits a prolonged systemic exposure in rats, with a similar C_{max} and a 44-77% higher total exposure. In rats, d9-caffeine freely crosses the blood-brain barrier.

In single-dose comparisons in humans, d9-caffeine exhibited a 29%–43% higher C_{max} and 4-5-fold higher total exposure than caffeine, and a 5-10-fold reduction in the relative exposure to the active metabolites of caffeine such as paraxanthine, theobromine, and theophylline.

Unlike conventional caffeine, the relative exposure of d9-caffeine was similar in slow versus rapid metabolizers of caffeine, while the relative exposure of caffeine is markedly higher in slow metabolizers.

== Pharmacodynamics: adenosine receptor affinity ==
Caffeine exerts its psychoactive and sympathomimetic effects by acting as an antagonist at adenosine receptors. d9-Caffeine was assessed for human adenosine receptor antagonism at the four receptor subtypes: A1, A2A, A2B, and A3, and found to have similar adenosine receptor affinity as caffeine.

== Safety and tolerance ==
d9-Caffeine was non-genotoxic in both the Ames’s bacterial reverse mutation assay and mammalian cell micronucleus assay. In a human clinical study, d9-caffeine was well tolerated with a safety profile similar to conventional caffeine.
