= C7H8N4O2 =

The molecular formula C_{7}H_{8}N_{4}O_{2} (molar mass: 180.16 g/mol) may refer to:

- Paraxanthine
- Theobromine
- Theophylline
