= Dimethylxanthine =

Dimethylxanthine may refer to the following xanthine derivatives with the formula C_{7}H_{8}N_{4}O_{2} (molar mass: 180.16 g/mol):

- Theophylline (1,3-dimethylxanthine)
- Paraxanthine (1,7-dimethylxanthine)
- Theobromine (3,7-dimethylxanthine)

== See also ==
- Xanthine § Pharmacology for a list of additional methylated xanthine derivatives
