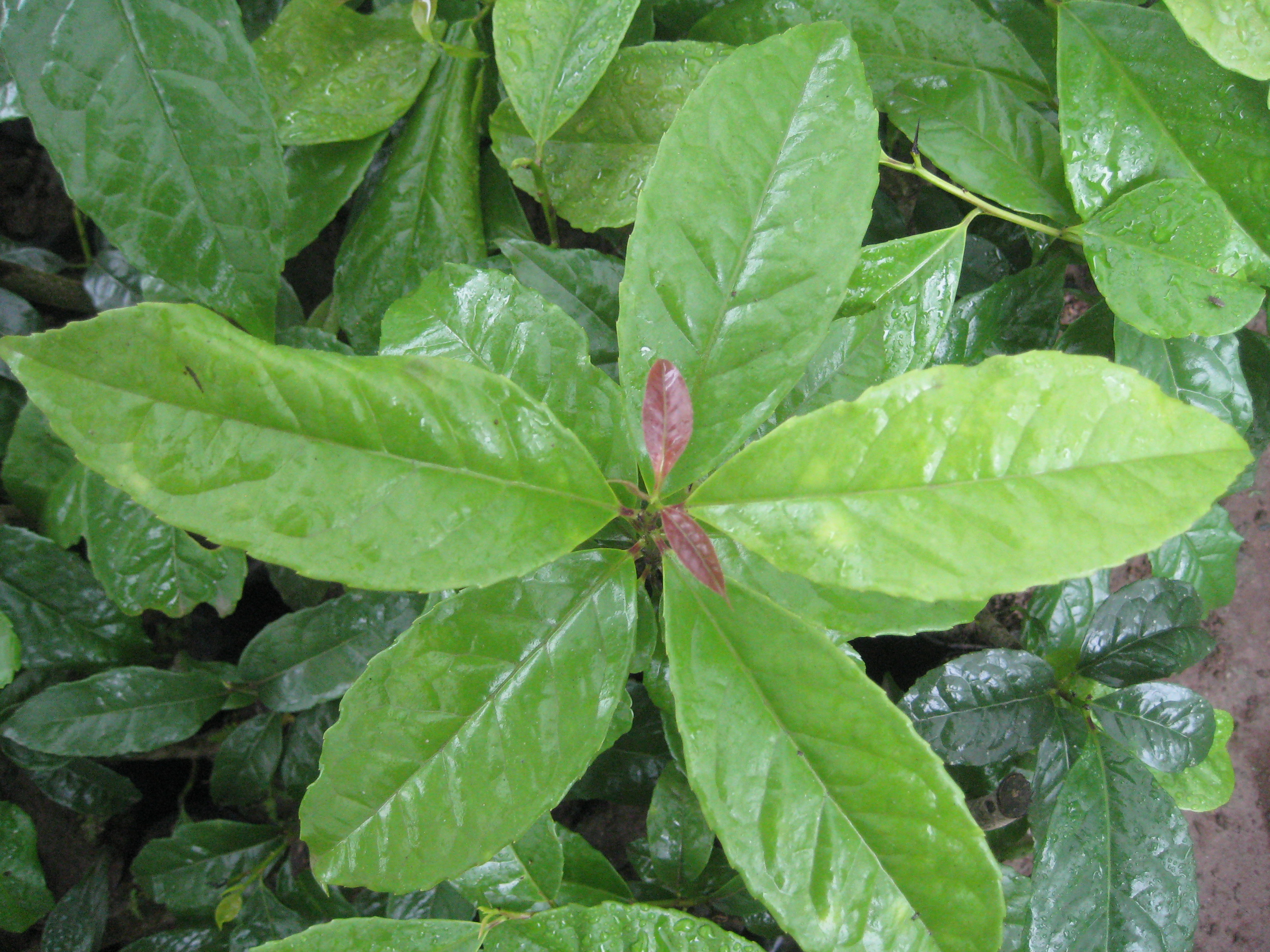

Conservation status
- Least Concern (IUCN 3.1)

Scientific classification
- Kingdom: Plantae
- Clade: Tracheophytes
- Clade: Angiosperms
- Clade: Eudicots
- Clade: Asterids
- Order: Aquifoliales
- Family: Aquifoliaceae
- Genus: Ilex
- Species: I. guayusa

Binomial name
- Ilex guayusa Loes.

Synonyms
- Ilex utilis Moldenke

= Ilex guayusa =

Species of holly

Ilex guayusa (/ˈaɪlɛks ˈɡwaɪjuːsə/ or /ˈaɪlɛks ˈwaɪjuːsə/) is a species of tree in the holly family, Aquifoliaceae. It is native to the Amazon rainforest. One of four known caffeinated holly trees, the leaves of the guayusa tree are harvested fresh and brewed like a tea for their stimulative effects. It is known simply as guayusa in western languages like Spanish, as waisa in Kichwa and as wayus or wais in Shuar.

== Description ==
Ilex guayusa is an evergreen dioecious tree which grows 6–30 m (20–98 ft) tall. The leaves are ovate, elliptic, oblong or lanceolate; 7–22 cm (2.8–8.7 in) long, 2.5–7 cm (0.98–2.76 in) wide; with serrate or dentate margin. The flowers are small and white, arranged in thyrses. The fruit is spherical and red, 6–7 mm (0.24–0.28 in) in diameter.

== Distribution and habitat ==
I. guayusa is native to the upper Amazonian regions of Ecuador, Peru, and southern Colombia, between 200–2,000 m (660–6,560 ft) of elevation. However, it has also been collected in Bolivia in 1939. It is present in evergreen or deciduous premontane forests, especially ones dominated by Dictyocaryum palms. Guayusa has been collected only rarely in the wild by botanists and is known almost exclusively as a cultivated plant (especially in the Ecuadorian provinces of Napo and Pastaza).

== Ecology ==
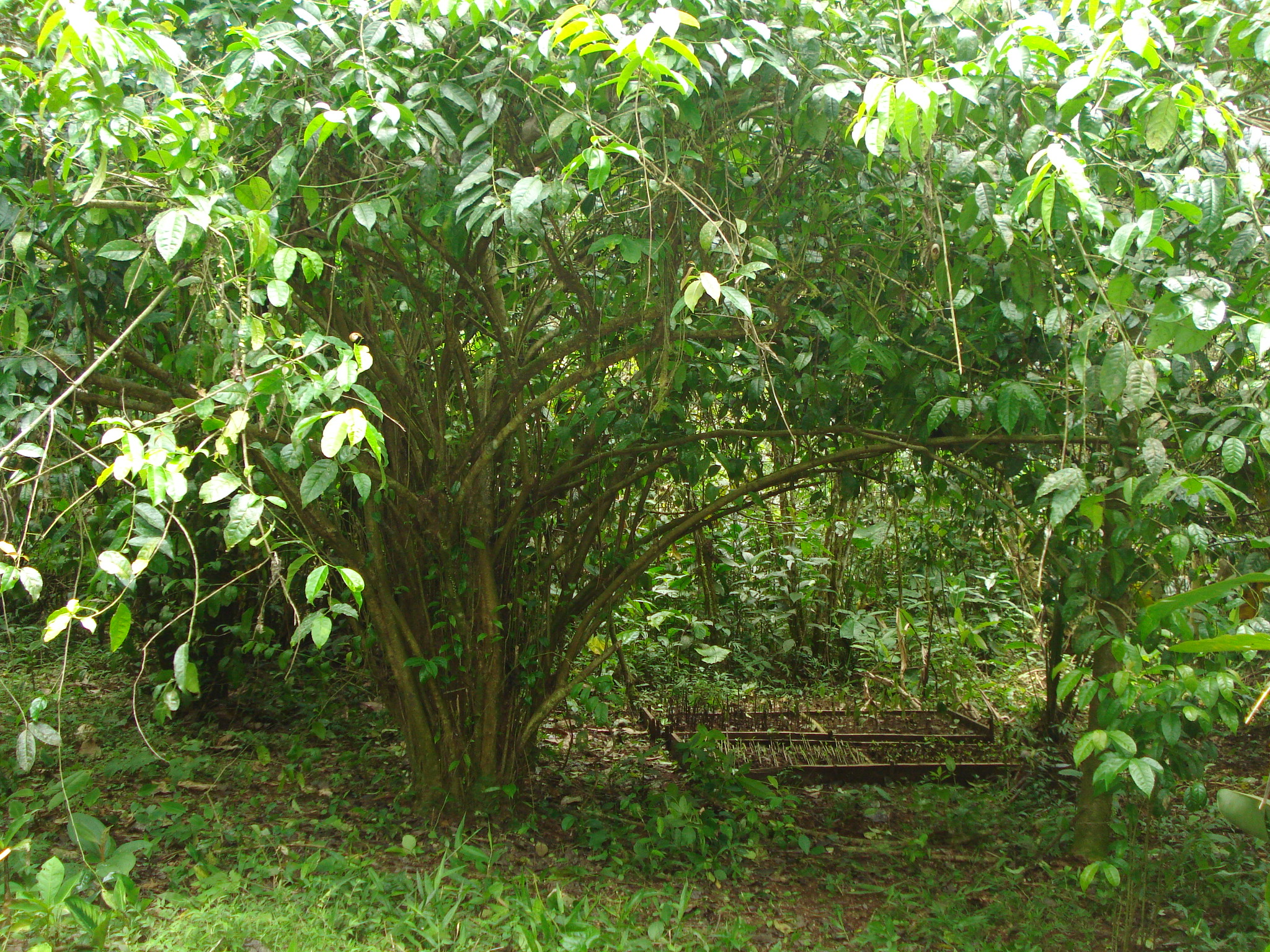
Photo of cultivated Ilex guayusa treelet

This species is found wild and cultivated in sandy-loamy soils of pH 4.34–5.01 with low cation-exchange capacity and high metal content. The vegetation type preferred is lowland and premontane, neotropical jungle where conditions of soil, precipitation and humidity are appropriate for its development. Despite being a monoecious species and prone to floral polygamy, Ilex guayusa appears to yield little fertile material, so it relies mostly on asexual reproduction (basal shoots, sprouts and suckers). In its initial growth stages, Ilex guayusa behaves as an understory species, becoming a shrub with spreading branches when it receives higher amounts of light, eventually becoming a tree.

== History ==
The earliest evidence of human utilization of this species is a 1,500-year-old bundle of guayusa leaves found in a medicine man's tomb in the Bolivian Andes, far beyond the natural range of the plant.

Father Juan Lorenzo Lucero reported in 1683 the daily consumption of guayusa in infusions by the Jivaroan peoples.

In the 18th century, several missionaries in Colombia, Ecuador and Peru wrote about the uses of the plant, and some of them also consumed the infusion citing digestive and stimulant properties.

The Jesuits knew about the medicinal uses of the plant and traded it actively.

A grove found in 1857 by Richard Spruce near the town of Baños, Ecuador was supposedly cultivated since precolumbian times.

== Uses ==
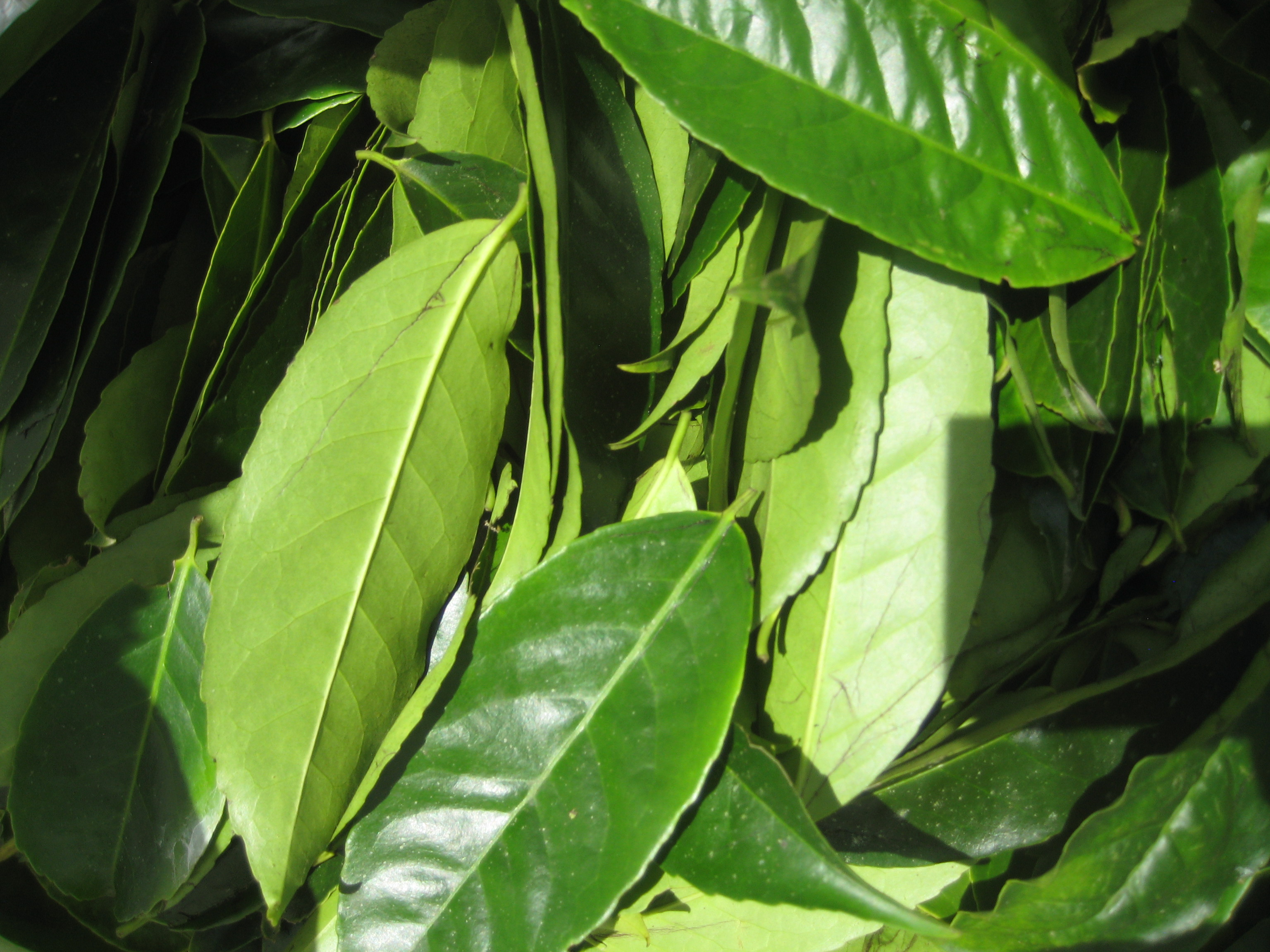
Leaves of Ilex guayusa

Leaves of Ilex guayusa are used to make an infusion, especially by the peoples of the Amazon basin, particularly in Ecuador, Peru and Colombia. After harvest, leaves are dried, which allows flavor to develop. In the three aforementioned countries, guayusa is also used in the preparation of artisanal alcoholic drinks.

The Kichwa people cultivate the plant in horticultural plots (called chakras) and use it as a daily drink. Guayusa is also consumed at parties and local festivals as a social drink which promotes conviviality (convivencia in Spanish), which improves affectivity, and close relationships among families and friends. The Kichwa usually boil guayusa in a pot and the infusion is served in gourds. Guayusa drinking is often accompanied by stories, dream interpretations and light work (like the weaving of nets). It can also be part of certain rituals. Guayusa is also used as a medicine and remedy, usually combined with ginger, lime juice, or sugar cane liquor.

Jivaroan peoples in Ecuador and Peru also prepare a drink from the leaves to be drunk in large amounts during pre-dawn ceremonies that involve the vomiting of the excess drink to wash out the stomach and small intestine and avoid absorbing too much caffeine. The Awajún people of northern Peru use guayusa in a similar fashion to that of the Jivaroans.

A ritual use by the Quechua people involves drinking guayusa infusion to have foretelling dreams for successful hunting expeditions.

Guayusa is also drunk by the mestizo and white populations of Ecuador. It has recently begun to be sold internationally, and is drunk by some individuals in the Western world as a caffeinated drink which can serve as an alternative to coffee and tea. It has been promoted in western media sources as a stimulant with high antioxidant and polyphenol content.

== Chemical composition ==
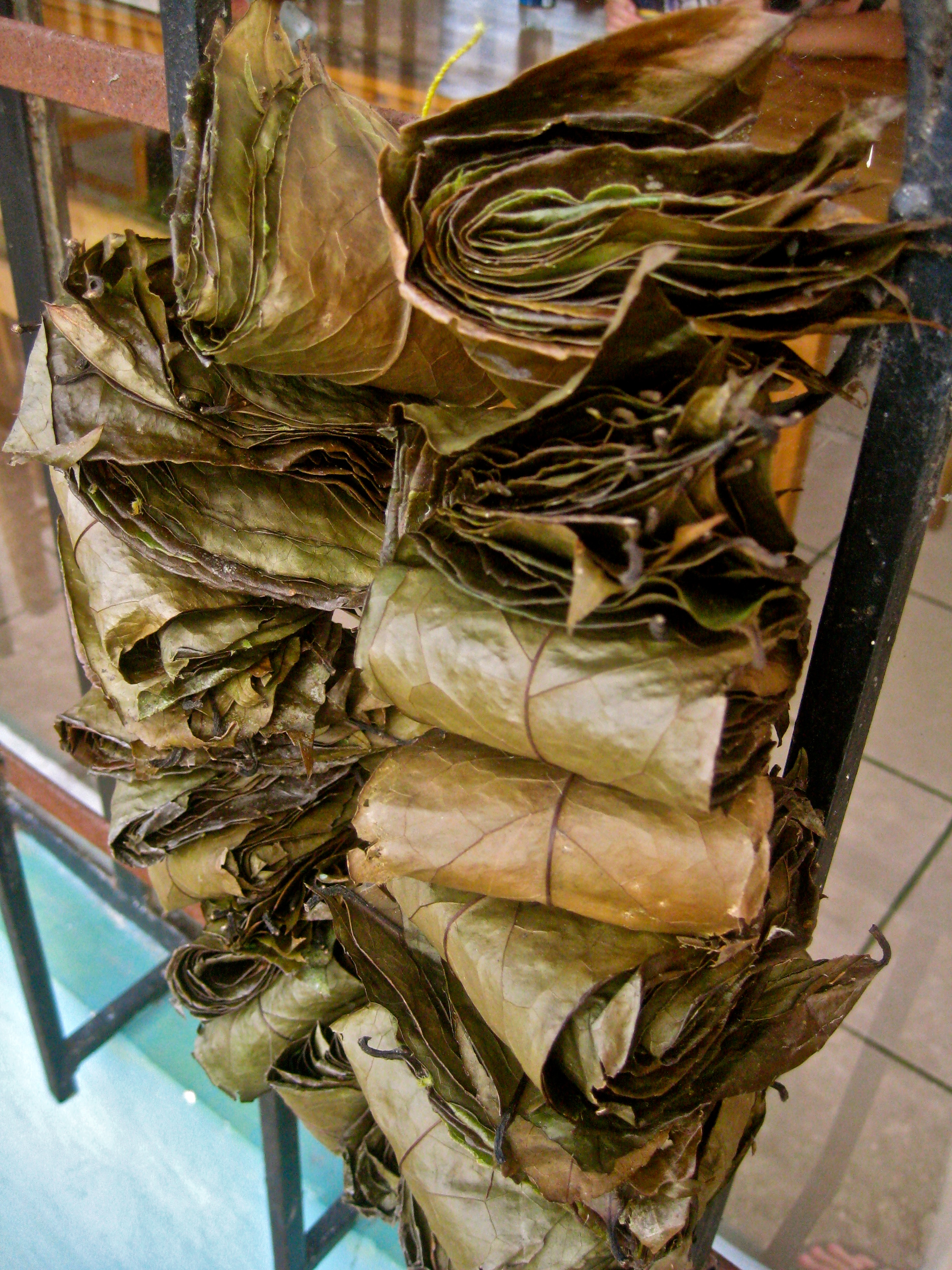
Dried leaves of Ilex guayusa.

Guayusa leaves contain caffeine (1.73–3.48 %), theobromine and other dimethylxanthines (among them paraxanthine and theophylline). Guayusa leaves also contain L-theanine, gallic acid, guanidine, isobutyric acid, nicotinic acid, ascorbic acid, riboflavin, choline, pyridoxine, triterpenes, chlorogenic acid and sugars among other compounds.

== See also ==
- Yerba mate (Ilex paraguariensis) - South American caffeinated holly species used to make Mate.
- Yaupon holly (Ilex vomitoria) - southeastern North American caffeinated holly species used to make the Black Drink.
- Kuding (Ilex kudingcha) - Asian holly species used with Ligustrum robustum for Chinese kǔdīng chá tea.
