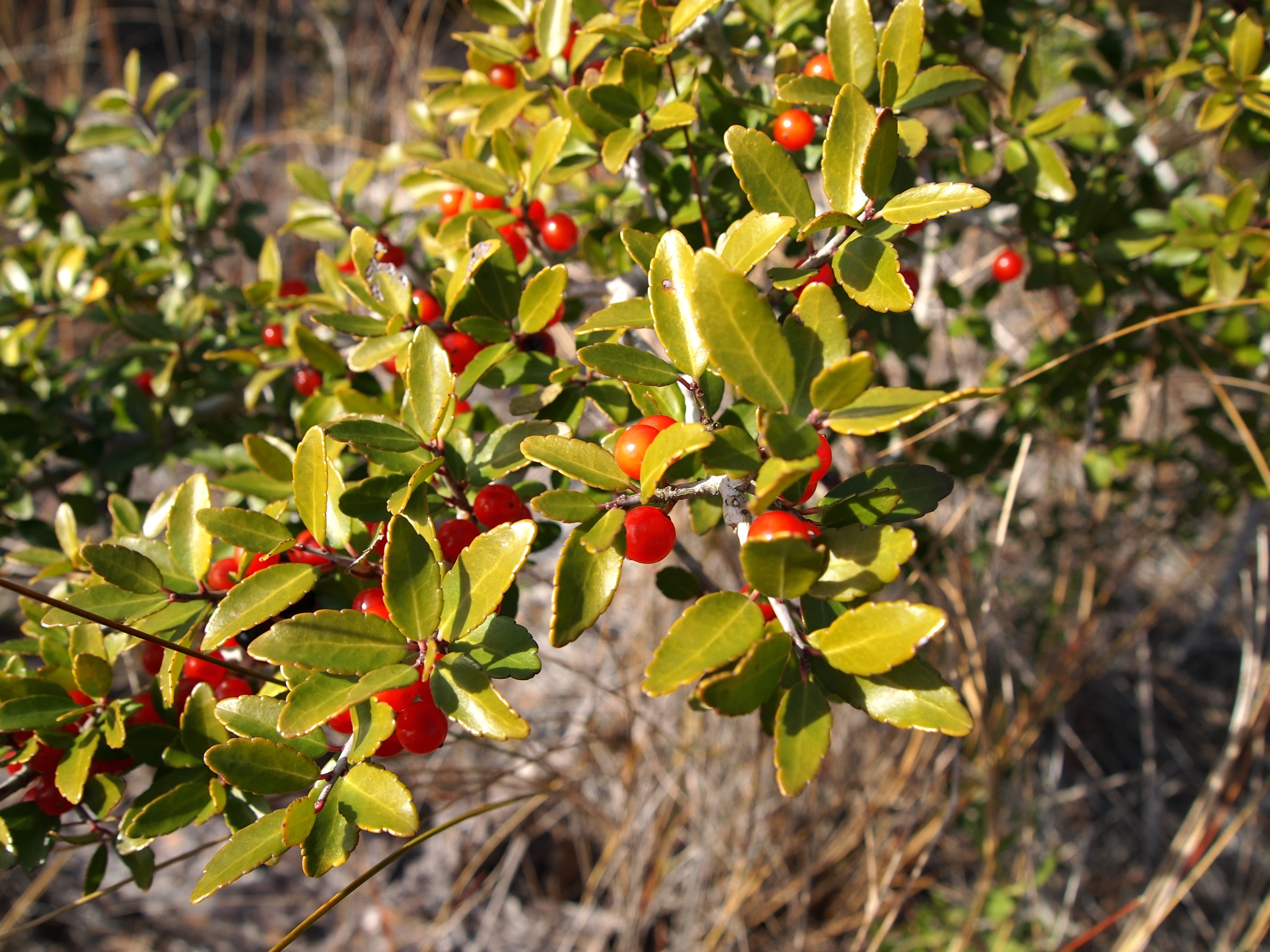
- Foliage and fruit

Conservation status
- Least Concern (IUCN 3.1)

Scientific classification
- Kingdom: Plantae
- Clade: Tracheophytes
- Clade: Angiosperms
- Clade: Eudicots
- Clade: Asterids
- Order: Aquifoliales
- Family: Aquifoliaceae
- Genus: Ilex
- Species: I. vomitoria

Binomial name
- Ilex vomitoria Sol. ex Aiton

Subspecies
- Ilex vomitoria subsp. chiapensis (Sharp) A.E.Murray; Ilex vomitoria subsp. vomitoria
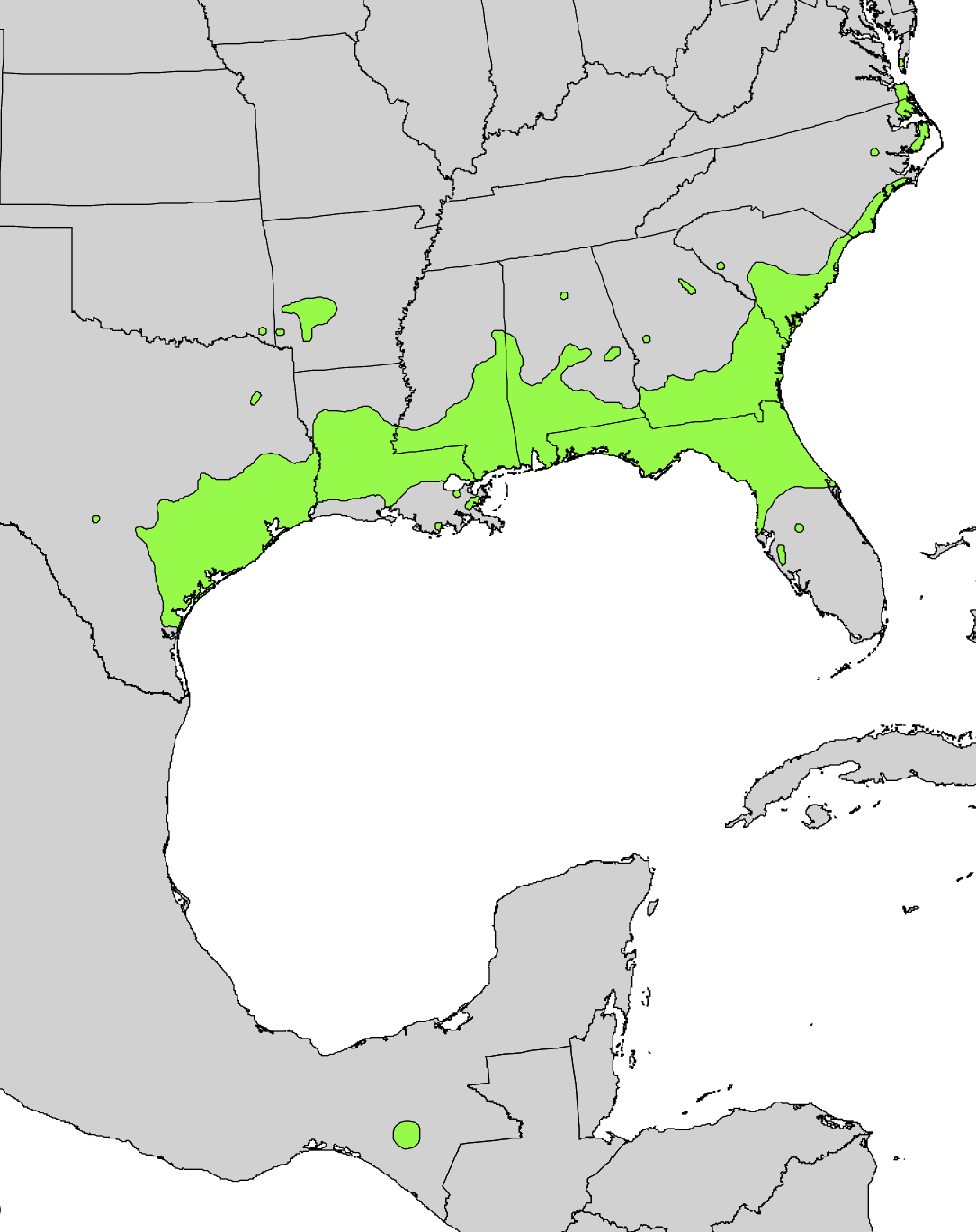
- Natural range

= Ilex vomitoria =

Species of holly

Ilex vomitoria, commonly known as yaupon (/ˈjɔːpɒn/) or yaupon holly, is a species of holly that is native to southeastern North America. The word yaupon was derived from the Catawban yą́pą, from yą- tree + pą leaf. Another common name, cassina, was borrowed from Timucua (despite this, it usually refers to Ilex cassine). The Latin name was given by early European observers who misunderstood Indigenous purification ceremonies—where vomiting was part of the ritual—and incorrectly assumed that the plant itself was emetic.

The plant was traditionally used by Native Americans and Euro-American colonists to make an infusion containing caffeine and theobromine. This drink went by different names, such as "cassina," "beloved drink," or "white drink" among natives and "Carolina tea" or "South Seas tea" among colonists. Today, it is also known as yaupon tea. It is one of only two known plants endemic to North America that produce caffeine. The other (containing 80% less) is Ilex cassine, commonly known as dahoon holly. In the 21st century, the plant has begun to be commmercially harvested for making a tea once again in the United States. Yaupon is also widely used for landscaping in its native range.

== Description ==
Yaupon holly is an evergreen shrub or small tree reaching 5–9 m tall, with smooth, light gray bark and slender, hairy shoots. The leaf arrangement is alternate, with leaves ovate to elliptical and a rounded apex with crenate or coarsely serrated margin, 1–4.5 cm long and 1–2 cm broad, glossy dark green above, slightly paler below. The flowers are 5–5.5 mm diameter, with a white four-lobed corolla. The fruit is a small round, shiny, and red (occasionally yellow) drupe 4–6 mm diameter containing four pits, which are dispersed by birds eating the fruit. The species may be distinguished from the similar Ilex cassine by its smaller leaves with a rounded, not acute, apex.

== Habitat and range ==
I. vomitoria occurs in the southeastern and south-central United States from the Eastern Shore of Virginia south to Florida and west to Oklahoma and Texas. It is also native to Cuba, and a disjunct population occurs in the southern Mexican state of Chiapas. It generally occurs in coastal areas in well-drained, sandy soils, and can be found on the upper edges of brackish and salt marshes, sandy hammocks, coastal sand dunes, inner-dune depressions, sandhills, maritime forests, nontidal forested wetlands, well-drained forests, and pine flatwoods.

== Ecology ==
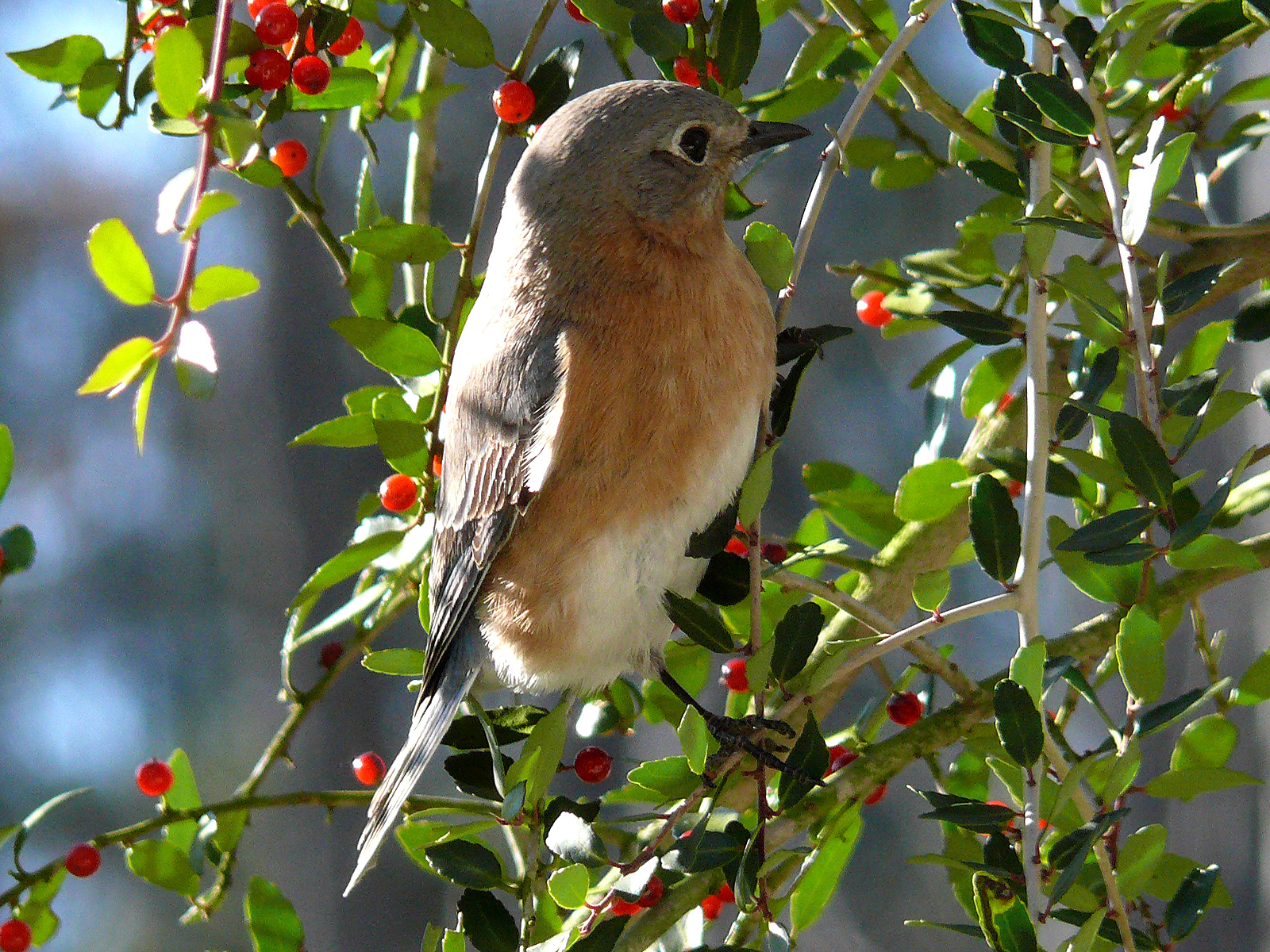
An eastern bluebird eating the bright red berries from an Ilex vomitoria

The fruit are an important food for many birds, including the mottled duck, American black duck, mourning dove, ruffed grouse, bobwhite quail, wild turkey, northern flicker, sapsuckers, cedar waxwing, eastern bluebird, American robin, gray catbird, northern mockingbird, and white-throated sparrow. Mammals that eat the fruit include nine-banded armadillo, American black bear, gray fox, raccoon, and skunk. The foliage and twigs are browsed by white-tailed deer.

== Cultivation and uses ==
=== Human consumption ===
Some Native American tribes, particularly in the Southeast, brewed the leaves and stems of Yaupon to make a ceremonial beverage known as the "black drink." These rituals often involved vomiting as a form of spiritual or physical purification—not because the plant itself was emetic. Early European observers misunderstood this practice and mistakenly concluded that Yaupon caused vomiting, hence the specific Latin name vomitoria. In reality, the active compounds in Yaupon—caffeine and theobromine—are the same as those found in its South American relatives, yerba mate and guayusa. Any vomiting likely resulted from the ceremonial context, which involved drinking large volumes while fasting, rather than from the plant's inherent properties.

Some theorize that Native Americans may have also used the infusion as a laxative. Ilex vomitoria usage by colonists for tea making and for medicinal uses in the Carolinas is documented by the early 18th century. In the English-speaking colonies, it was known variously as cassina, yaupon tea, Indian tea, Carolina tea, and Appalachian tea. In the 21st century, the process of drying the leaves for consumption has gained newfound popularity, and yaupon is now commercially available.

=== Ornamental ===
Ilex vomitoria is a common landscape plant in the Southeastern United States. The most common cultivars are slow-growing shrubs popular for their dense, evergreen foliage and their adaptability to pruning into hedges of various shapes. These include:

- 'Folsom Weeping' – weeping cultivar
- 'Grey's Littleleaf'/'Grey's Weeping' – weeping cultivar
- 'Nana'/'Compacta' – dwarf female clone usually remaining below 1 m in height
- 'Pride of Houston' – female clone similar to type but featuring improvements in form, fruiting, and foliage
- 'Schilling's Dwarf'/'Stokes Dwarf' – dwarf male clone that grows no more than 0.6 m tall and 1.2 m wide
- 'Will Fleming' – male clone featuring a columnar growth habit
- 'Pendula' – "weeping" variety, has the highest caffeine content

== See also ==
- Ilex paraguariensis or yerba mate – a caffeinated holly native to subtropical South America
- Ilex guayusa or guayusa – a caffeinated holly native to the Ecuadorian Amazon Rainforest
- Kuding – a Chinese tisane made from I. kudingcha
- Yaupon Beach, North Carolina - a former town and current neighborhood of Oak Island, North Carolina
