= Kuding =

Bitter infusion used in traditional Chinese medicine

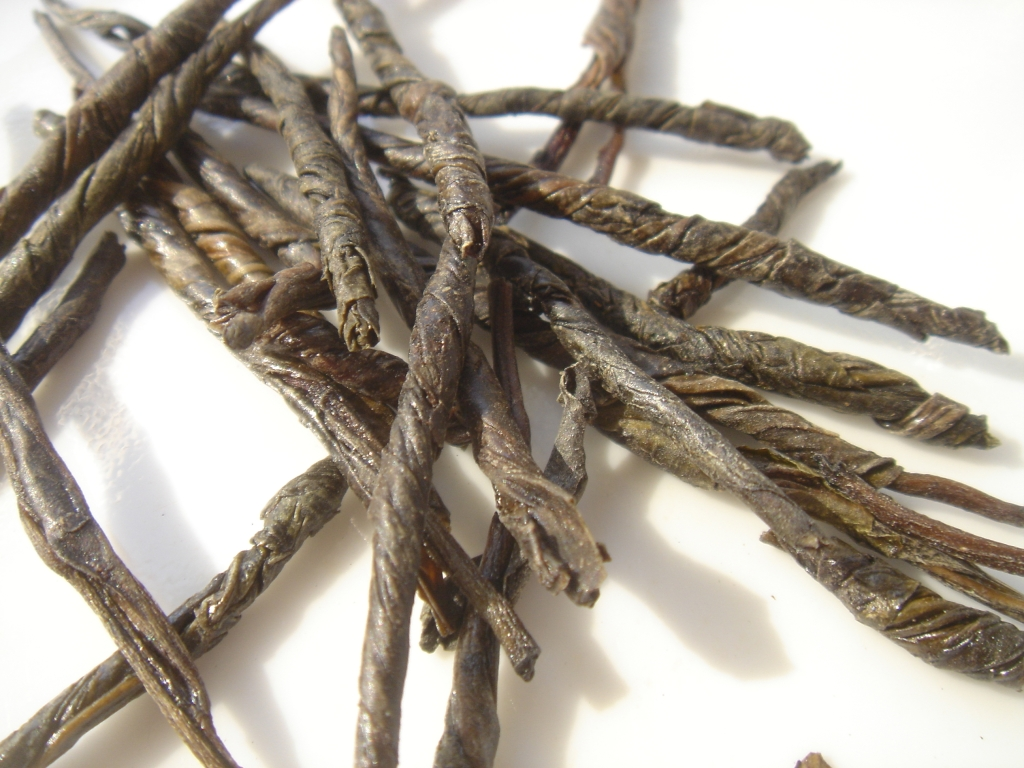
Twisted kuding leaves ready for brewing (Ilex kaushue)

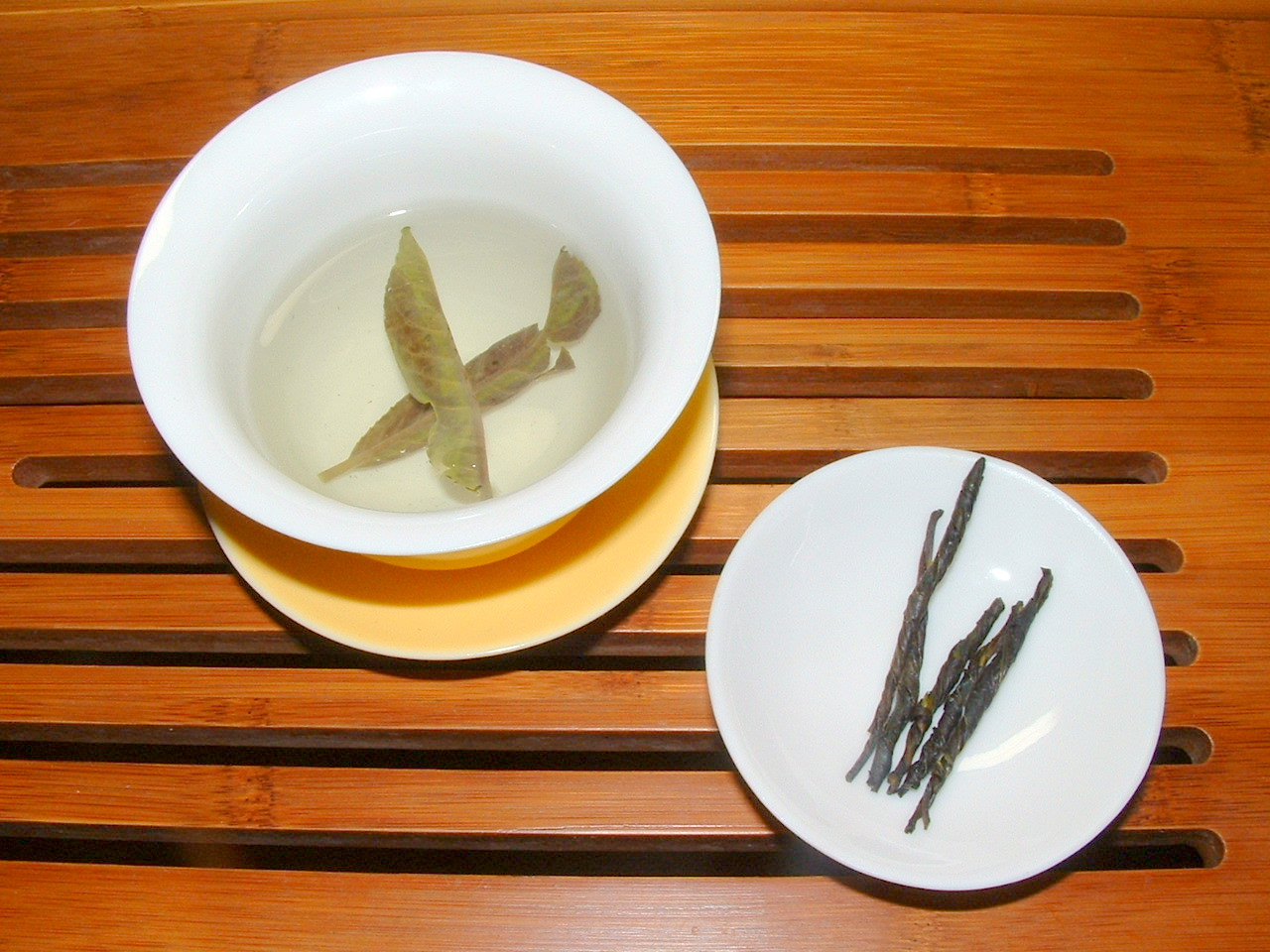
Kuding Ilex kaushue, "一葉茶" (一叶茶)

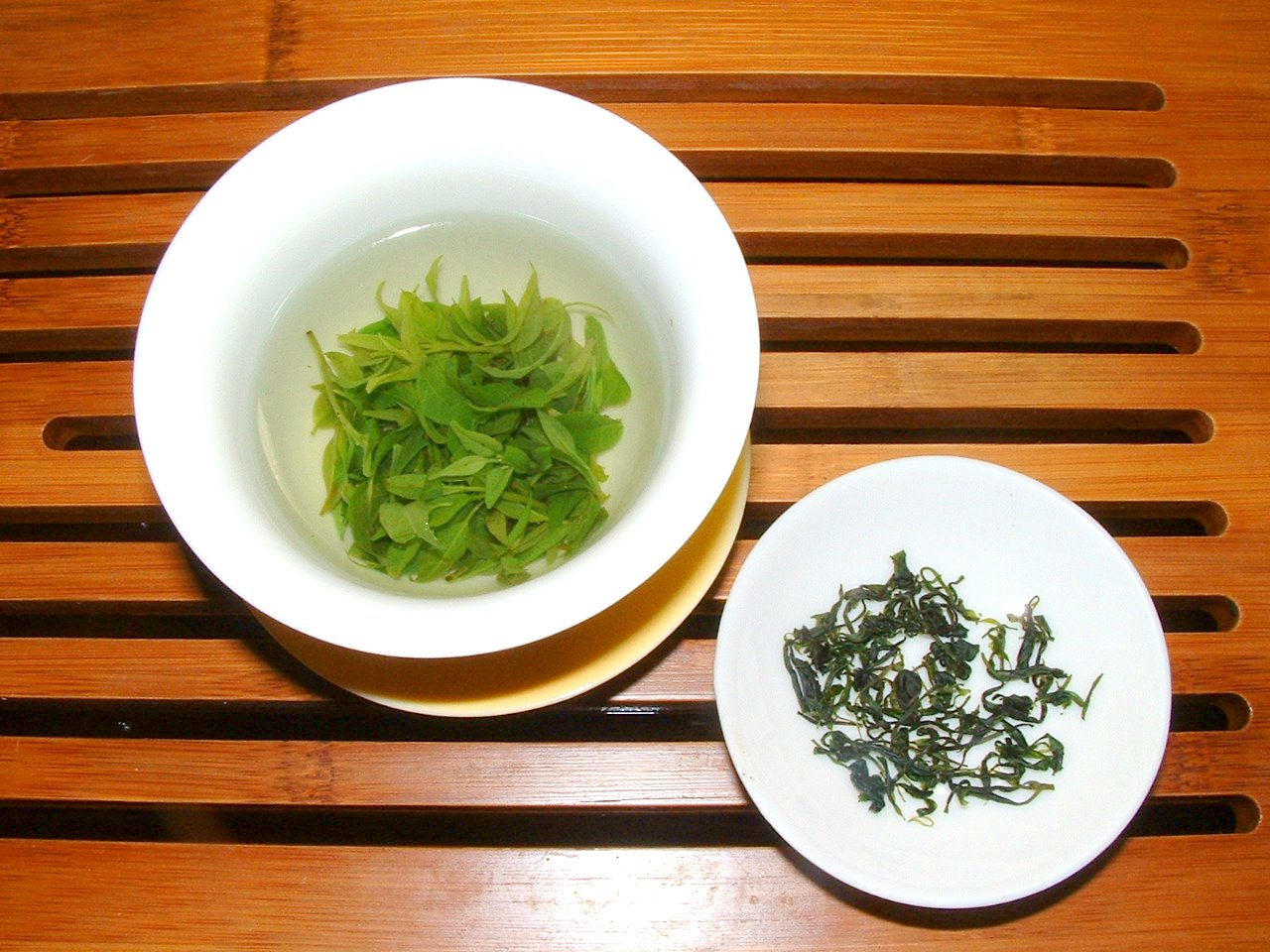
Kuding Ligustrum robustum, "靑山綠水" (青山绿水)

Kuding (Chinese: 苦丁茶; pinyin: kǔdīng chá; lit. 'bitter nail tea'; pronounced [kʰù.tíŋ ʈʂʰǎ]) is a particularly bitter-tasting Chinese infusion, which due to their similarities in appearance is derived from several plant species. The two most common plants used to make kuding are the wax tree species Ligustrum robustum and the holly species Ilex kaushue (synonym: Ilex kudingcha), the former being more commonly grown in Sichuan and Japan while the latter is most commonly grown and used in the rest of China and Vietnam. Tea produced from Ligustrum ('privets') or the many species of Ilex is caffeine-free, although not Ilex paraguariensis (Yerba mate), the source of mate drunk in South America and the Levant.

== Folk medicine ==
The traditional Chinese medicinal properties associated with kuding (and many other plants) include its ability to disperse fever, clear the head and the eyes, and resolve toxin, thus being used for common cold, rhinitis, itching eyes, red eyes, and headache. It is also said to calm fidgets and alleviate thirst, especially when one is suffering from a disease that causes fever or severe diarrhea. It transforms phlegm and alleviates coughing, thus used in treating bronchitis. Finally, it is said to invigorate digestion and improve mental focus and memory.

Some research may suggest that the herb, derived from either Ilex or Ligustrum, promotes blood circulation, lowers blood pressure, and lowers blood lipids, including cholesterol. It has the reputation of preventing deterioration of the heart and brain function and maintaining proper body weight. It has also been found that Kuding made from L. robustum has similar anti-oxidative effects to tea in addition to additional anti-inflammatory properties.

== Chemistry ==
Triterpenes and their glycosides (saponins) are contained as bitter components, and a variety of them have been isolated from the plants that produce kuding, such as ursolic acid, pentene, lupeol, taraxerol, and uvaol. Additionally, β-sitosterol, a phytosterol, has been reported.

Compared to green tea, catechins (about 1.7%) are reported to be less abundant, while rutin (about 0.4%) is more abundant. In addition, kuding is reported to contain more zinc, manganese, copper, and selenium, and less amino acids and ascorbic acid than green tea.

== See also ==
- Yerba mate or Ilex paraguariensis - A species of holly that also contains caffeine and is popularly used to make mate in Paraguay, Uruguay, Argentina and Brazil.
- Ilex guayusa - also known as "guayusa", is an Amazonian tree, native to the Ecuadorian Amazon Rainforest.
- Ilex vomitoria - "Yaupon Holly", a caffeine containing plant from North America.
- Green tea
