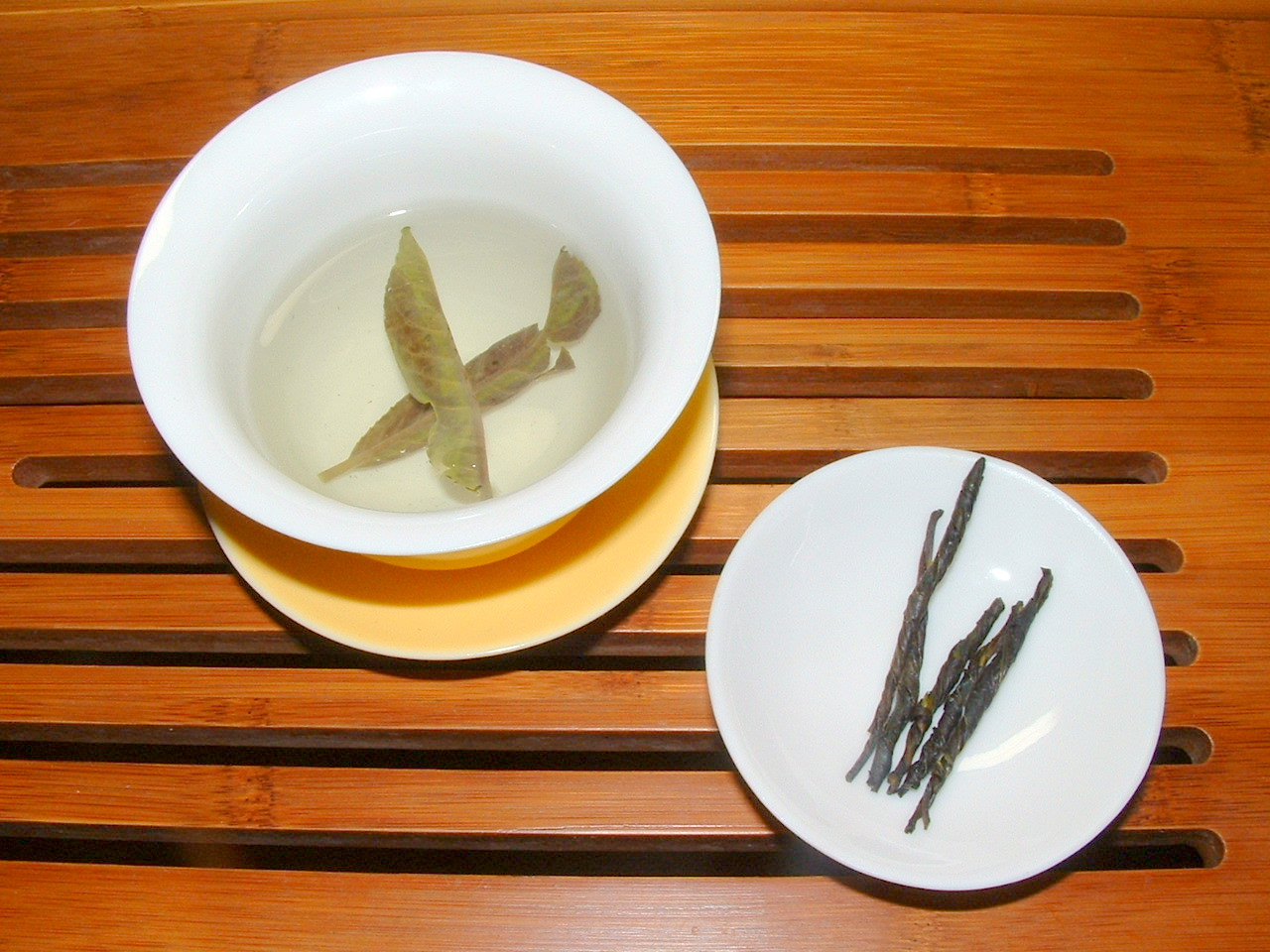
- Tea made with the dried leaves of Ilex kaushue

Scientific classification
- Kingdom: Plantae
- Clade: Embryophytes
- Clade: Tracheophytes
- Clade: Spermatophytes
- Clade: Angiosperms
- Clade: Eudicots
- Clade: Asterids
- Order: Aquifoliales
- Family: Aquifoliaceae
- Genus: Ilex
- Species: I. kaushue

Binomial name
- Ilex kaushue S.Y.Hu

Synonyms
- Ilex kudingcha C.J. Tseng; Ilex latifolia fo. puberula D. Fang & Z.M. Tan

= Ilex kaushue =

Species of holly

Ilex kaushue is a species of plant in the holly family, Aquifoliaceae, which is used to make a very bitter infusion called kuding. It is native to southern China and northern Vietnam, growing in dense forests, a tree up to 8 metres (26 ft) tall.
