= Paraxanthine =

- Skeletal formula of paraxanthine

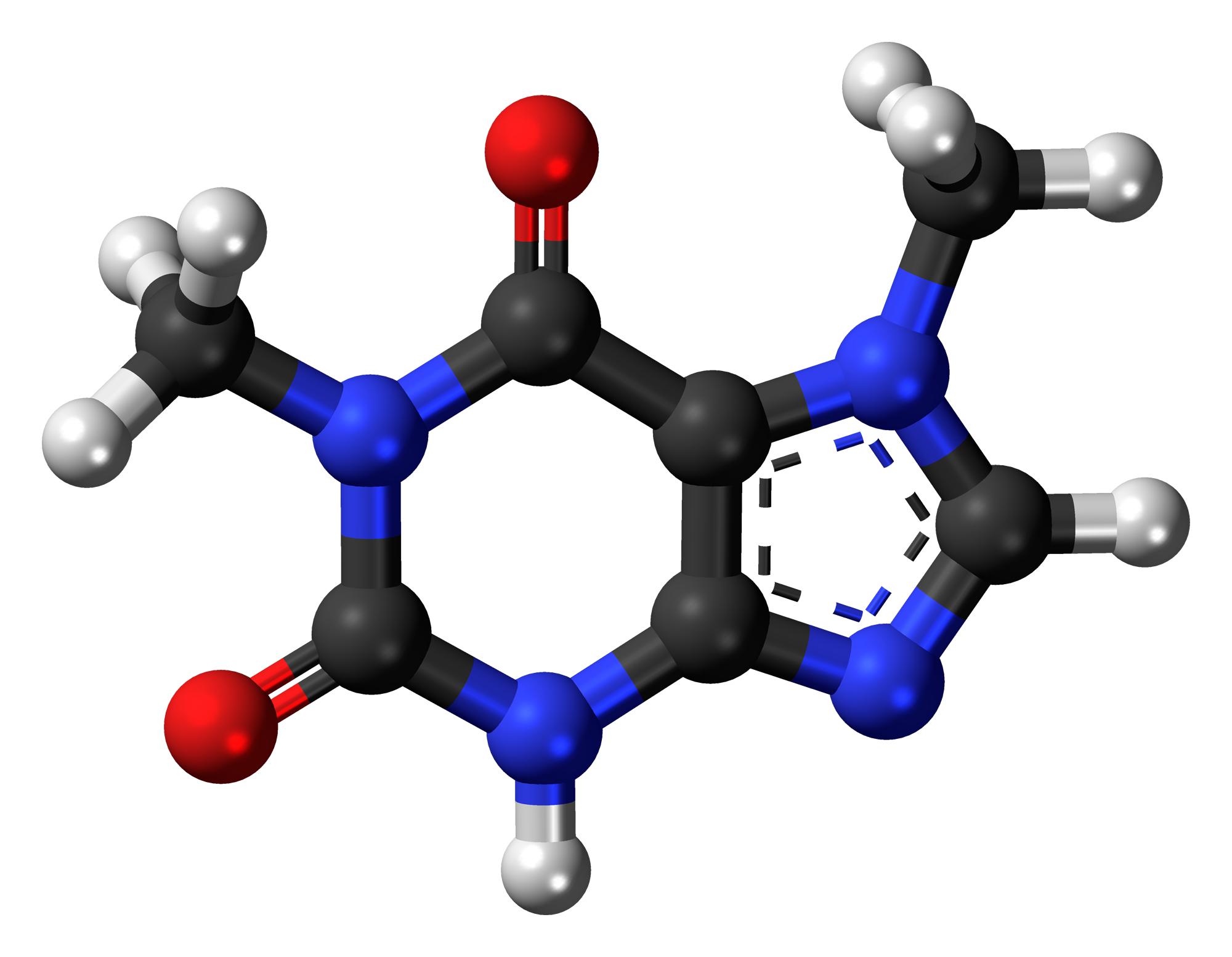
- Ball-and-stick model of the paraxanthine model

Clinical data
- Other names: 1,7-Dimethylxanthine; 3-Desmethylcaffeine; 3-Demethylcaffeine
- Routes of administration: Oral
- Drug class: Adenosine receptor antagonist; Phosphodiesterase inhibitor; Stimulant; Wakefulness-promoting agent

Pharmacokinetic data
- Metabolites: 1-Methylxanthine, others
- Elimination half-life: 3.1 hours
- Excretion: Urine: 60% unchanged

Identifiers
- IUPAC name: 1,7-dimethyl-3H-purine-2,6-dione
- CAS Number: 611-59-6
- PubChem CID: 4687
- ChemSpider: 4525
- UNII: Q3565Y41V7
- ChEBI: CHEBI:25858
- ChEMBL: ChEMBL1158
- CompTox Dashboard (EPA): DTXSID2052281
- ECHA InfoCard: 100.009.339

Chemical and physical data
- Formula: C_{7}H_{8}N_{4}O_{2}
- Molar mass: 180.167 g·mol^{−1}
- 3D model (JSmol): Interactive image
- Melting point: 351 to 352 °C (664 to 666 °F)
- SMILES: O=C2Nc1ncn(c1C(=O)N2C)C
- InChI: InChI=1S/C7H8N4O2/c1-10-3-8-5-4(10)6(12)11(2)7(13)9-5/h3H,1-2H3,(H,9,13); Key:QUNWUDVFRNGTCO-UHFFFAOYSA-N

Paraxanthine, also known as 1,7-dimethylxanthine, is a stimulant drug of the xanthine family related to caffeine. It is the major metabolite of caffeine and is a positional isomer of theobromine and theophylline. The drug acts as an adenosine receptor antagonist similarly to caffeine. Unlike caffeine, theobromine, and theophylline, paraxanthine occurs in only trace amounts in plants like Coffea arabica. It started being sold in energy drinks as an alternative to caffeine in the United States in 2023.

== Toxicity ==
Paraxanthine is believed to exhibit a lower toxicity than caffeine and the caffeine metabolite, theophylline. In a mouse model, intraperitoneal paraxanthine doses of 175 mg/kg/day did not result in animal death or overt signs of stress; by comparison, the intraperitoneal _{LD50} for caffeine in mice is reported at 168 mg/kg. In in vitro cell culture studies, paraxanthine is reported to be less harmful than caffeine and the least harmful of the caffeine-derived metabolites in terms of hepatocyte toxicity.

As with other methylxanthines, paraxanthine is reported to be teratogenic when administered in high doses; but it is a less potent teratogen as compared to caffeine and theophylline. A mouse study on the potentiating effects of methylxanthines coadministered with mitomycin C on teratogenicity reported the incidence of birth defects for caffeine, theophylline, and paraxanthine to be 94.2%, 80.0%, and 16.9%, respectively; additionally, average birth weight decreased significantly in mice exposed to caffeine or theophylline when coadministered with mitomycin C, but not for paraxanthine coadministered with mitomycin C.

Paraxanthine was reported to be significantly less clastogenic compared to caffeine or theophylline in an in vitro study using human lymphocytes.

== Pharmacology ==
=== Pharmacodynamics ===
Like caffeine, paraxanthine is a psychoactive central nervous system (CNS) stimulant.

Studies indicate that, similar to caffeine, simultaneous antagonism of adenosine receptors is responsible for paraxanthine's stimulatory effects. Paraxanthine adenosine receptor binding affinity (21 μM for A1, 32 μM for A2_{A}, 4.5 μM for A2_{B}, and >100 μM for A3) is similar or slightly stronger than caffeine, but weaker than theophylline.

Paraxanthine is a selective inhibitor of cGMP-preferring phosphodiesterase (PDE9) activity and is hypothesized to increase glutamate and dopamine release by potentiating nitric oxide signaling. Activation of a nitric oxide-cGMP pathway may be responsible for some of the behavioral effects of paraxanthine that differ from those associated with caffeine.

Paraxanthine is a competitive nonselective phosphodiesterase inhibitor which raises intracellular cAMP, activates PKA, inhibits TNF-alpha and leukotriene synthesis, and reduces inflammation and innate immunity.

Unlike caffeine, paraxanthine acts as an enzymatic effector of Na^{+}/K^{+} ATPase. As a result, it is responsible for increased transport of potassium ions into skeletal muscle tissue. Similarly, the compound also stimulates increases in calcium ion concentration in muscle.

=== Pharmacokinetics ===
Paraxanthine is not known to be produced by plants but is observed in nature as a metabolite of caffeine in animals and some species of bacteria.

Paraxanthine is the primary metabolite of caffeine in humans and other animals, such as mice. Shortly after ingestion, roughly 84% of caffeine is metabolized into paraxanthine by hepatic cytochrome P450, which removes a methyl group from the N3 position of caffeine. After formation, paraxanthine can be broken down to 7-methylxanthine by demethylation of the N1 position, which is subsequently demethylated into xanthine or oxidized by CYP2A6 and CYP1A2 into 1,7-dimethyluric acid. In another pathway, paraxanthine is broken down into 5-acetylamino-6-formylamino-3-methyluracil through N-acetyl-transferase 2, which is then broken down into 5-acetylamino-6-amino-3-methyluracil by non-enzymatic decomposition. In yet another pathway, paraxanthine is metabolized CYP1A2 forming 1-methyl-xanthine, which can then be metabolized by xanthine oxidase to form 1-methyl-uric acid.

The pharmacokinetic parameter for paraxanthine are similar to those for caffeine, but differ significantly from those for theobromine and theophylline, the other major caffeine-derived methylxanthine metabolites in humans.

Comparative pharmacokinetics of caffeine and caffeine-derived methylxanthines
	Plasma half-life (t_{1/2}; hr)	Volume of distribution (V_{ss,}unbound; l/kg)	Plasma clearance (CL; ml/min/kg)
Caffeine	4.1 ± 1.3	1.06 ± 0.26	2.07 ± 0.96
Paraxanthine	3.1 ± 0.8	1.18 ± 0.37	2.20 ± 0.91
Theobromine	7.2 ± 1.6	0.79 ± 0.15	1.20 ± 0.40
Theophylline	6.2 ± 1.4	0.77 ± 0.17	0.93 ± 0.22

== Chemistry ==
=== Analogues ===
Analogues of paraxanthine (1,7-dimethylxanthine) include caffeine (1,3,7-trimethylxanthine), theophylline (1,3-dimethylxanthine), and theobromine (3,7-dimethylxanthine), among many others.
