= Theobromine =

Bitter alkaloid of the cacao plant

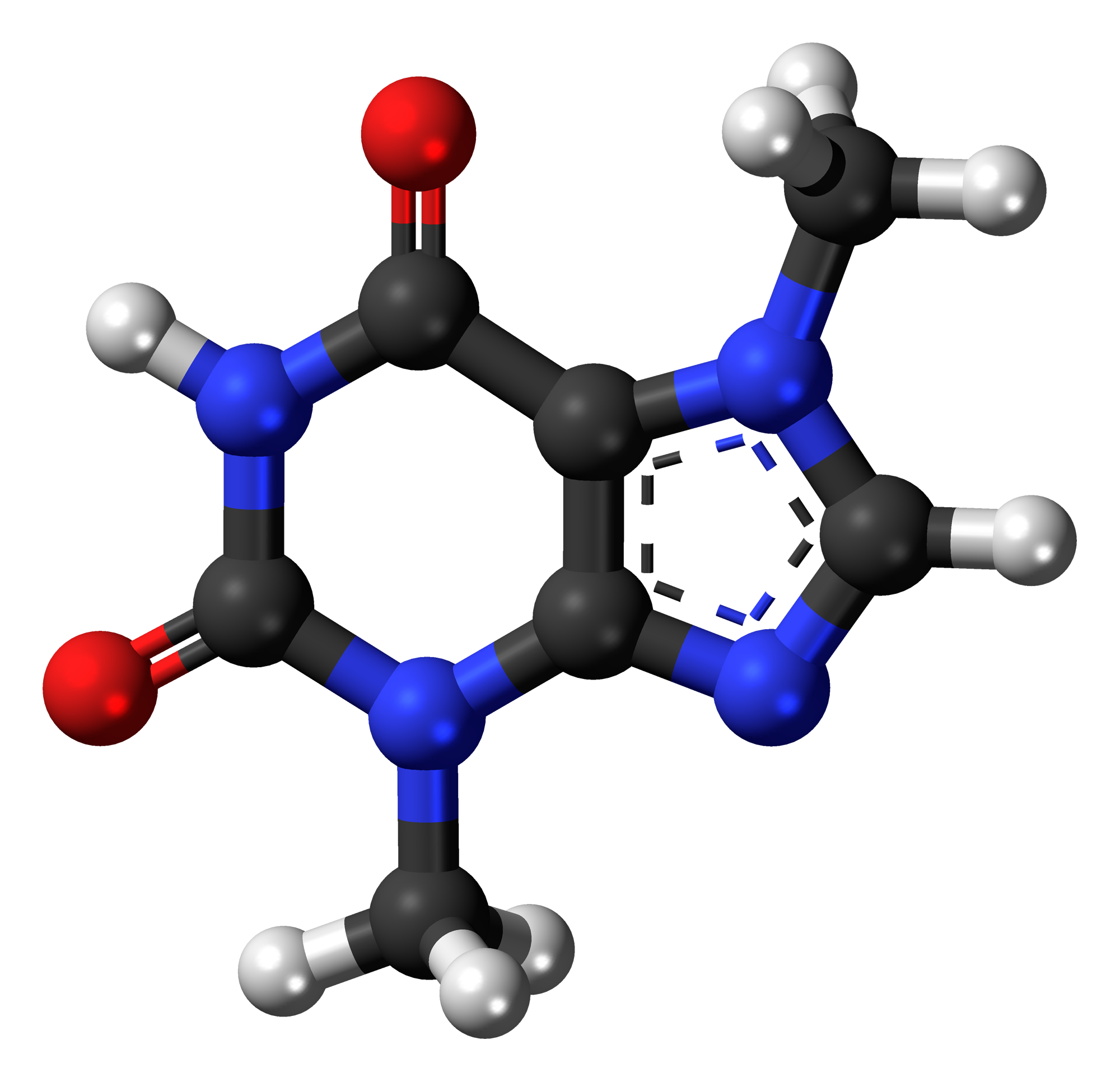

Clinical data
- Other names: xantheose diurobromine 3,7-dimethylxanthine 3,7-dihydro-3,7-dimethyl-1H-purine-2,6-dione
- Dependence liability: None
- Routes of administration: Oral
- ATC code: C03BD01 (WHO) R03DA07 (WHO)

Legal status
- Legal status: In general: Unscheduled.

Pharmacokinetic data
- Metabolism: Hepatic demethylation and oxidation
- Elimination half-life: 6–8 hours
- Excretion: Renal (10% unchanged, rest as metabolites)

Identifiers
- IUPAC name: 3,7-dimethyl-1H-purine-2,6-dione
- CAS Number: 83-67-0
- PubChem CID: 5429
- DrugBank: DB01412
- ChemSpider: 5236
- UNII: OBD445WZ5P
- KEGG: C07480
- ChEBI: CHEBI:28946
- ChEMBL: ChEMBL1114
- CompTox Dashboard (EPA): DTXSID9026132
- ECHA InfoCard: 100.001.359

Chemical and physical data
- Formula: C_{7}H_{8}N_{4}O_{2}
- Molar mass: 180.167 g·mol^{−1}
- 3D model (JSmol): Interactive image
- SMILES: Cn1cnc2c1c(=O)[nH]c(=O)n2C
- InChI: InChI=1S/C7H8N4O2/c1-10-3-8-5-4(10)6(12)9-7(13)11(5)2/h3H,1-2H3,(H,9,12,13); Key:YAPQBXQYLJRXSA-UHFFFAOYSA-N

Theobromine
Properties
Appearance	white solid
Density	1.524 g/cm^{3}
Melting point	351 °C (664 °F; 624 K)
Solubility in water	330 mg/L)

Theobromine, also known as xantheose, is the principal alkaloid of Theobroma cacao (cacao plant). Theobromine is slightly water-soluble (330 mg/L) with a bitter taste. In industry, theobromine is used as an additive and precursor to some cosmetics. It is found in chocolate and several other foods, including tea (Camellia sinensis), some American hollies (yaupon and guayusa) and the kola nut. It is a white or colourless solid, but commercial samples can appear yellowish.

Theobromine, a metabolite of caffeine, is processed in the liver into xanthine and methyluric acid, peaks in the blood 2–3 hours after ingestion due to its fat solubility, and primarily acts by inhibiting adenosine receptors with minor phosphodiesterase inhibition. It is a mild heart stimulant and bronchodilator in humans with limited central nervous system effects. It can be toxic or fatal to animals like dogs and cats due to their slower metabolism of the compound.

== Structure ==
Theobromine is a flat molecule, a derivative of purine and an isomer of theophylline. It is also classified as a dimethyl xanthine. Related compounds include theophylline, caffeine, paraxanthine, and 7-methylxanthine, each of which differ in the number or placement of the methyl groups.

== History ==
Theobromine was discovered in 1841 in cacao beans by the chemist A. Woskresensky. Synthesis of theobromine from xanthine was first reported in 1882 by Hermann Emil Fischer.

== Etymology ==
Theobromine is derived from Theobroma, the name of the genus of the cacao tree, with the suffix -ine given to alkaloids and other basic nitrogen-containing compounds. That name in turn is made up of the Greek roots theo ("god") and broma ("food"), meaning "food of the gods".

Despite its name, the compound contains no bromine, which is based on Greek bromos ("stench").

== Sources ==
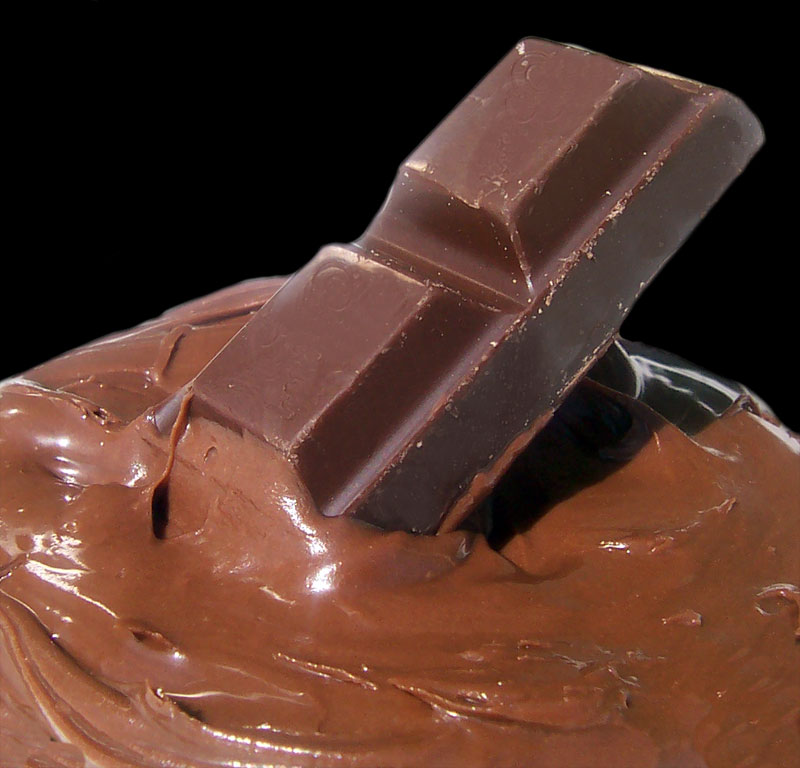
A chocolate bar and molten chocolate. Chocolate is made from the cocoa bean, which is a natural source of theobromine.

Theobromine is the primary alkaloid found in cocoa and chocolate. Cocoa butter only contains trace amounts of theobromine. There are usually higher concentrations in dark than in milk chocolate.

There are approximately 60 milligrams (1 grain) of theobromine in 28 grams (1 oz) of milk chocolate, while the same amount of dark chocolate contains about 200 milligrams (3 grains). Cocoa beans naturally contain approximately 1% theobromine.

Plant species and components with substantial amounts of theobromine are:

- Theobroma cacao – seed and seed coat
- Theobroma bicolor – seed coat
- Ilex paraguariensis – leaf
- Ilex guayusa – leaf
- Ilex vomitoria – leaf
- Camellia sinensis – leaf

Theobromine can also be found in trace amounts in the kola nut, the guarana berry, yerba mate (Ilex paraguariensis), and the tea plant.

The mean theobromine concentrations in cocoa and carob products are:

Item	Mean theobromine per 100 g
Cocoa powder	2060 mg
Cocoa beverages	266 mg
Chocolate toppings	195 mg
Chocolate bakery products	147 mg
Cocoa cereals	69.5 mg
Chocolate ice creams	62.1 mg
Chocolate milks	22.6 mg
Carob products	0.00–50.4 mg

=== Biosynthesis ===
Theobromine is a purine alkaloid derived from xanthosine, a nucleoside. Cleavage of the ribose and N-methylation yields 7-methylxanthosine. 7-Methylxanthosine in turn is the precursor to theobromine, which in turn is the precursor to caffeine.

== Pharmacology ==
Caffeine is metabolized in the liver into three primary metabolites: paraxanthine (84%), theobromine (12%), and theophylline (4%)

Even without dietary intake, theobromine may occur in the body as it is a product of the human metabolism of caffeine, which is metabolised in the liver into 12% theobromine, 4% theophylline, and 84% paraxanthine.

In the liver, theobromine is metabolized into xanthine and subsequently into methyluric acid. Important enzymes include CYP1A2 and CYP2E1. The elimination half life of theobromine is between 6 and 8 hours.

Unlike caffeine, which is highly water-soluble, theobromine is only slightly water-soluble and is more fat soluble, and thus peaks more slowly in the blood. While caffeine peaks after only 30 minutes, theobromine requires 2–3 hours to peak.

The primary mechanism of action for theobromine inside the body is inhibition of adenosine receptors. Its effect as a phosphodiesterase inhibitor is thought to be small.

== Effects ==
=== Humans ===
Theobromine is a heart stimulator and diuretic but has no significant stimulant effect on the human central nervous system. It is a bronchodilator and causes relaxation of vascular smooth muscle. It is available as a prescription drug in South Korea. The amount of theobromine found in chocolate is small enough that chocolate can, in general, be safely consumed by humans.

Compared with caffeine, theobromine is weaker in both its inhibition of cyclic nucleotide phosphodiesterases and its antagonism of adenosine receptors. The potential phosphodiesterase inhibitory effect of theobromine is seen only at amounts much higher than what people normally would consume in a typical diet including chocolate.

==== Toxicity ====
At doses of 0.8–1.5 g/day (50–100 g cocoa), sweating, trembling and severe headaches were noted, with limited mood effects found at 250 mg/day.

Also, chocolate may be a factor for heartburn in some people because theobromine may affect the esophageal sphincter muscle in a way that permits stomach acids to enter the esophagus.

=== Animals ===
Theobromine is the reason chocolate is poisonous to dogs. Dogs and other animals that metabolize theobromine (found in chocolate) more slowly can succumb to theobromine poisoning from as little as 50 g (1.8 oz) of milk chocolate for a smaller dog and 400 g (14 oz), or around nine 44-gram (1.55 oz) small milk chocolate bars, for an average-sized dog. The concentration of theobromine in dark chocolates (about 10 g/kg (0.16 oz/lb)) is up to 10 times that of milk chocolate (1 to 5 g/kg (0.016 to 0.080 oz/lb)), meaning dark chocolate is far more toxic to dogs per unit weight or volume than milk chocolate.

The median lethal dose of theobromine for dogs is 100–200 mg/kg (0.0016–0.0032 oz/lb); therefore, a 10 kg (22 lb) dog would need to consume a minimum of 200 g (7.1 oz) of the most theobromine-rich (5 g/kg (0.080 oz/lb)) dark chocolate, or a maximum of 1 kg (2.2 lb) (of theobromine-rich milk chocolate), to have a 50% chance of receiving a lethal dose. However, even 40 g (1.4 oz) of milk chocolate may induce vomiting and diarrhea.

The same risk is reported for cats as well, although cats are less likely to ingest sweet food, as cats lack sweet taste receptors. Complications include digestive issues, dehydration, excitability, and a slow heart rate. Later stages of theobromine poisoning include epileptic-like seizures and death. If caught early on, theobromine poisoning is treatable. Although not common, the effects of theobromine poisoning can be fatal.

== See also ==
- History of chocolate
- Theodrenaline
