= Intraventricular block =

- ECG characteristics of an intraventricular block subtype - RBBB showing wide QRS complexes with a terminal R wave in lead V1 and a prolonged S wave in lead V6.
- Specialty: Cardiology
- Diagnostic method: electrocardiogram

An intraventricular block is a heart conduction disorder — heart block of the ventricles of the heart. An example is a right bundle branch block, right fascicular block, bifascicular block, trifascicular block.

== Types ==
Types of intraventricular blocks are

- Fascicular block
  - Left anterior fascicular block
  - Left posterior fascicular block
- Trifascicular block
- Bifascicular block (RBBB with fascicular block)
- Right bundle branch block (RBBB)
- Left bundle branch block (LBBB)

== Intraventricular conduction delay ==
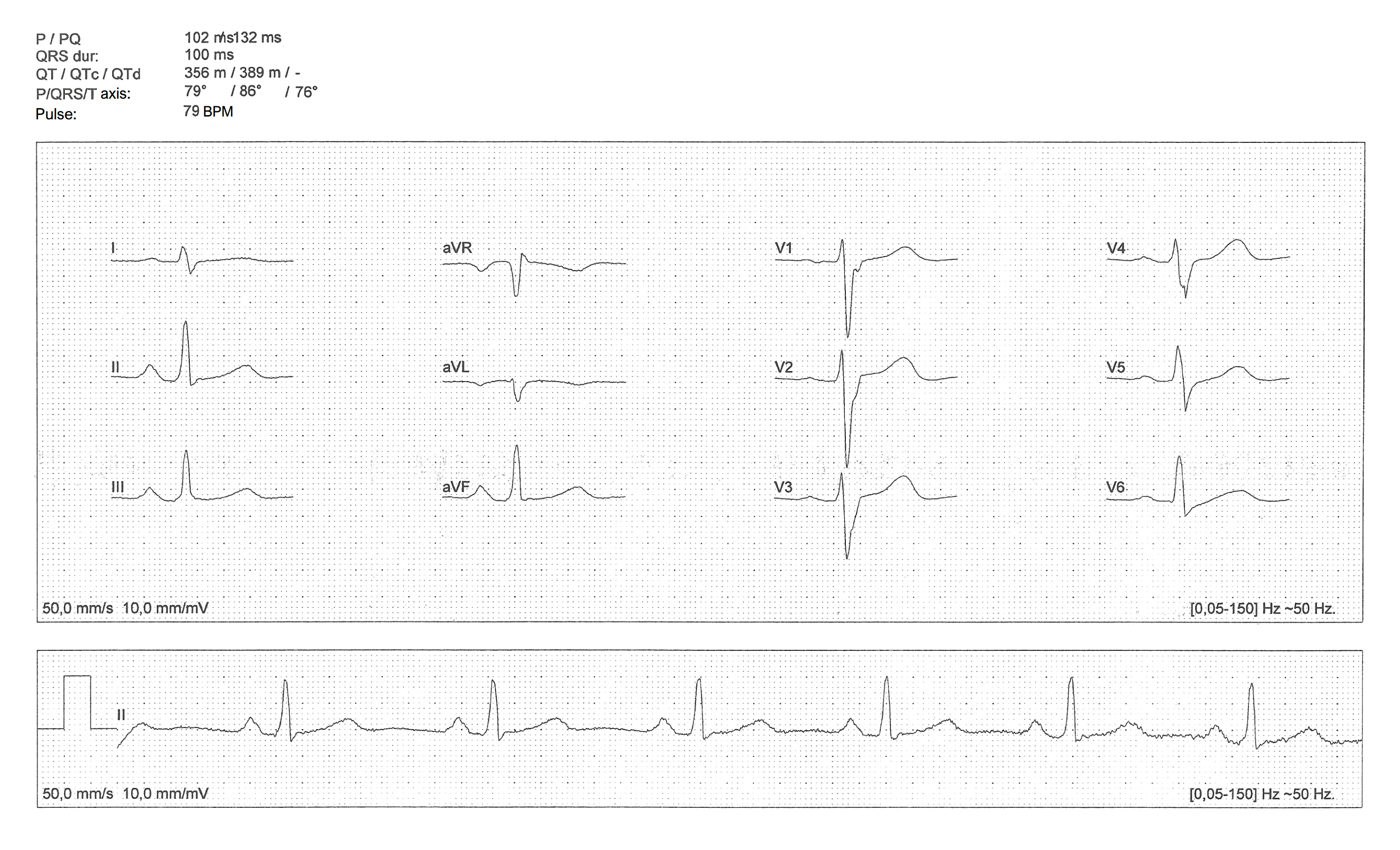
Intraventricular conduction delay seen in precordial/chest leads with QRS duration 100 ms. An EKG of a 25-year-old male.

Intraventricular conduction delays (IVCD) are conduction disorders seen in intraventricular propagation of supraventricular impulses resulting in changes in the QRS complex duration or morphology, or both. IVCD can be caused by abnormalities in the structures of bundle of His, Purkinje fibers or ventricular myocardium. Nonspecific intraventricular conduction delay (NICD) is a delay with widened QRS complex but without a specific intraventricular block present.
