= Fascicular block =

Fascicular block may refer to:

- Left anterior fascicular block
- Left posterior fascicular block
- Bifascicular block
- Trifascicular block
