= List of medical abbreviations: L =

Sortable table
Abbreviation	Meaning
L	leukocytes lumbar vertebrae (L1 to L5)
L&D	labor and delivery
LA	left atrium lymphadenopathy local anesthetic
LAAM	L-alpha-acetylmethadol
Lab	laboratory (in health care, usually referring to clinical laboratory)
LABA	long-acting beta agonist
LABBB	left anterior bundle branch block
Lac	laceration lactate
LAD	left anterior descending (a coronary artery) leukocyte adhesion deficiency left axis deviation (see electrocardiogram) lymphadenopathy
LAE	left atrial enlargement
LAH	left anterior hemiblock
LAHB	left anterior hemiblock
Lam	laminectomy
LAN	lymphadenopathy
LAP	leukocyte alkaline phosphatase
Lap	laparotomy
Lap appy	laparoscopic appendectomy
LAR	low anterior resection
LARP	left → anterior, right → posterior (path of the vagi as they wander from thorax to abdomen)
LAS	lymphadenopathy syndrome
Lat	lateral
lb LB	pound or pounds (mass)
LBBB	left bundle branch block
LBO	large bowel obstruction
LBP	low back pain
LBW	low birth weight
LCA	left coronary artery
LCHAD	long-chain 3-hydroxyacyl-coenzyme A dehydrogenase
LCIS	lobular carcinoma in situ
LCM	lymphocytic meningitis
LCMV	lymphocytic choriomeningitis virus
LCP	Liverpool Care Pathway for the Dying Patient
LCPD	Legg–Calvé–Perthes disease
LCV	leukocytoclastic vasculitis
LCX	left circumflex artery
L&D	labor and delivery
LDH	lactate dehydrogenase
LDL	low-density lipoprotein
LDL-C	low-density lipoprotein cholesterol
L-DOPA	levo-dihydroxyphenylalanine
LEC	lupus erythematosus cell
LEEP	loop electrical excision procedure
LES	lower esophageal sphincter lupus erythematosus systemicus
LE	lupus erythematosus lower extremity (human leg)
leu	leukocytes
LFT	liver function test
LGA	large for gestational age
LGL	Lown–Ganong–Levine syndrome
LGM	lymphogranulomatosis maligna
LGMD	limb-girdle muscular dystrophy
LGSIL	low-grade squamous intraepithelial lesion
LGV	lymphogranuloma venereum
LH	luteinizing hormone lightheadedness
LHC	left heart catheterization
LHRH	luteinizing hormone–releasing hormone
Lig	ligament
LIH	left inguinal hernia
LLD	leg length discrepancy
LLE	left lower extremity
LLETZ	large loop excision of the transformation zone
LLL	left lower lobe
LLQ	left lower quadrant
LM	left main
LMA	left mentoanterior (fetal position) laryngeal mask airway
LMCA	left main coronary artery
LMD	local medical doctor
LMP	last menstrual period (first day of the most recent menstrual period) low malignant potential
LMWH	low-molecular-weight heparin
LN	lymph node Logical Observation Identifiers Names and Codes (LOINC)
LND	lymph node dissection
LNG	levonorgestrel
LNI	lymph node involvement
LOA	left occipitoanterior (fetal position) level of activity lysis of adhesions Loss of Appetite
LOC	loss of consciousness level of consciousness (e.g., "altered LOC from head trauma")
LOF	leakage of fluid
LOH	loss of heterozygosity
LOI	loss of imprinting
LOL	little old lady (often LOL in NAD—see House of God) lymph-obligatory load
LOM	limitation of motion
LOP	left occiput posterior (fetal position)
LORTA	loss of resistance to air (in anesthesiology; when placing epidural, LORTA indicates entrance of needle to epidural space)
LOS	length of stay
Lot	lotion
LOT	left occiput transverse (fetal position)
Lp	lipoprotein
LP	lumbar puncture
LPH	left posterior hemiblock (see heart block)
LPL	lipoprotein lipase
LPP	lichen planopilaris
LQTS	long QT syndrome
L/S	lecithin-to-sphingomyelin ratio
LS	lichen sclerosus Lynch syndrome
LSA	lichen sclerosis et atrophicus
LSB	left sternal border
LSCS	Lower segment Caesarean section
LSCTA	lung sounds clear to auscultation
LSIL	low-grade squamous intraepithelial lesion
LST	laterally spreading tumor
LR	lactated Ringer's solution
LRINEC	Laboratory Risk Indicator for Necrotizing Soft Tissue Infections Score
LRTI	lower respiratory tract infection
LT	heat-labile enterotoxin
LTAC	long-term acute care
LTCS	low transverse cesarean section
LUL	left upper lobe (of lung)
LUQ	left upper quadrant (of abdomen)
LUS	lower uterine segment
LUTS	lower urinary tract symptoms
LV	left ventricle
LVAD	left ventricular assist device
LVEDP	left ventricular end diastolic pressure
LVEF	left ventricular ejection fraction
LVF	left ventricular failure
LVH	left ventricular hypertrophy
LVOT	left ventricular outflow tract
LVNC	left ventricular noncompaction (see noncompaction cardiomyopathy)
LVP	Large volume paracentesis
LWBS	left without being seen
Lx of ch	laxative of choice
lx investigations
Ly	lymphocytes
lytes	electrolytes
