= Electrocardiography in myocardial infarction =

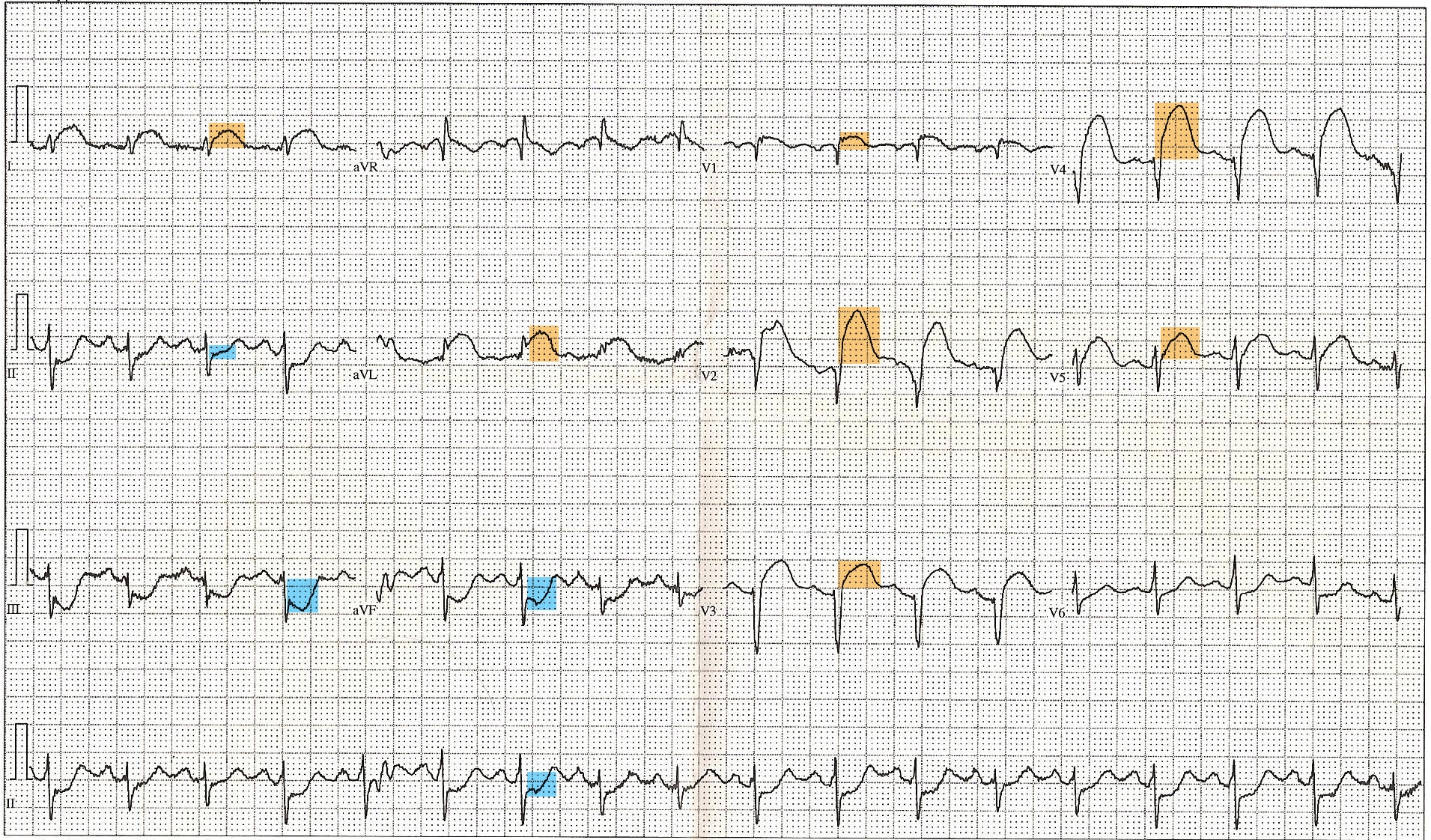
- 12-lead electrocardiogram showing ST-segment elevation (orange) in I, aVL and V1-V5 with reciprocal changes (blue) in the inferior leads, indicative of an anterior wall myocardial infarction.
- Purpose: detecting ischemia or acute coronary injury in emergency department

Electrocardiography in suspected myocardial infarction has the main purpose of detecting ischemia or acute coronary injury in emergency department populations coming for symptoms of myocardial infarction (MI). Also, it can distinguish different clinical types of myocardial infarction.

== Technical issues ==
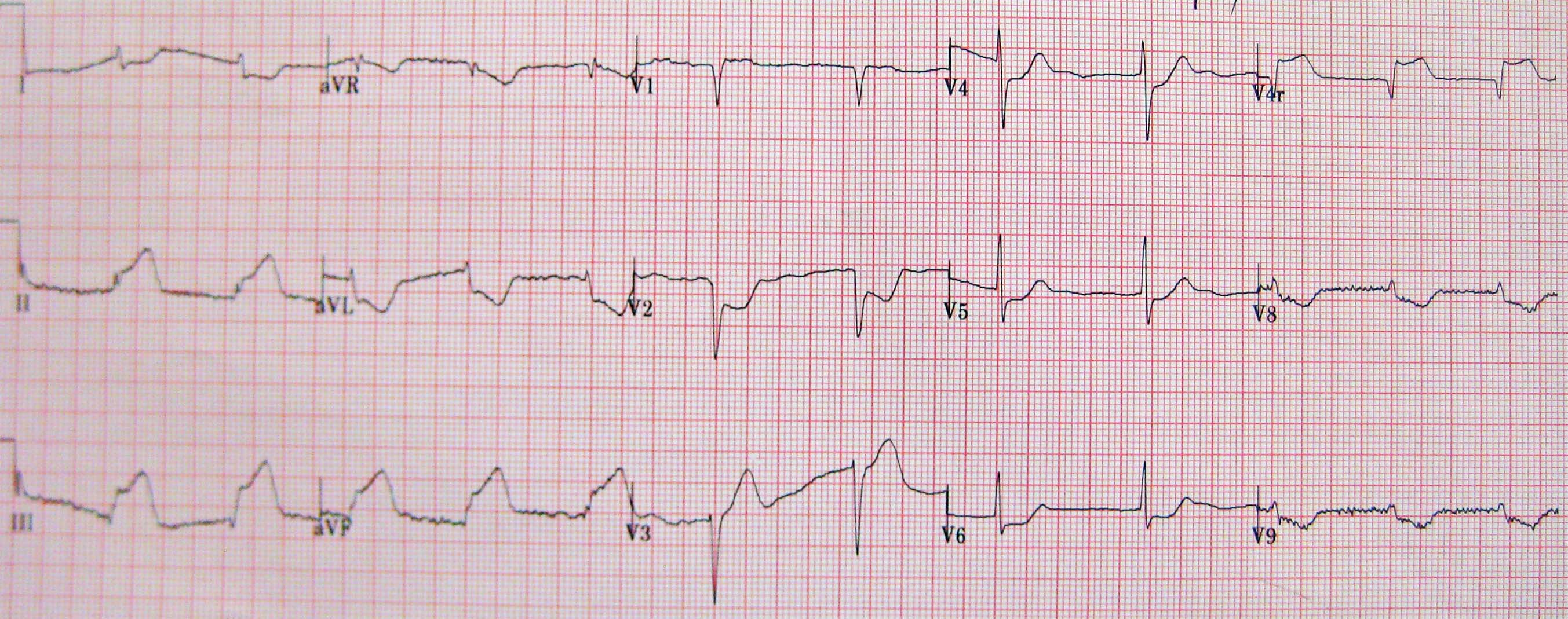
An acute STEMI involving the inferior and right ventricular wall. Reciprocal changes are seen in the anterior leads.

The standard 12 lead electrocardiogram (ECG) has several limitations. An ECG represents a brief sample in time. Because unstable ischemic syndromes have rapidly changing supply versus demand characteristics, a single ECG may not accurately represent the entire picture. It is therefore desirable to obtain serial 12 lead ECGs, particularly if the first ECG is obtained during a pain-free episode. Alternatively, many emergency departments and chest pain centers use computers capable of continuous ST segment monitoring. The standard 12 lead ECG also does not directly examine the right ventricle, and is relatively poor at examining the posterior basal and lateral walls of the left ventricle. In particular, acute myocardial infarction in the distribution of the circumflex artery is likely to produce a nondiagnostic ECG. The use of additional ECG leads like right-sided leads V3R and V4R and posterior leads V7, V8, and V9 may improve sensitivity for right ventricular and posterior myocardial infarction. In spite of these limitations, the 12 lead ECG remains central to risk stratification for the patient with suspected acute myocardial infarction. Mistakes in interpretation are relatively common, and the failure to identify high risk features can negatively affect patient care.

== Main patterns ==
The 12 lead ECG is used to classify MI patients into one of three groups:

1. those with ST segment elevation or new bundle branch block (suspicious for acute injury and a possible candidate for acute reperfusion therapy with thrombolytics or primary PCI),
2. those with ST segment depression or T wave inversion (suspicious for ischemia), and
3. those with a so-called non-diagnostic or normal ECG. However, a normal ECG does not rule out acute myocardial infarction.

=== ST elevation MI ===
The 2018 European Society of Cardiology/American College of Cardiology Foundation/American Heart Association/World Health Federation Universal Definition of Myocardial Infarction for the ECG diagnosis of the ST segment elevation type of acute myocardial infarction require new ST elevation at J point of at least 1mm (0.1 mV) in two contiguous leads with the cut-points: ≥1 mm in all leads other than leads V2-V3. For leads V2-V3: ≥2 mm in men ≥40 years, ≥2.5 mm in men <40 years, or ≥1.5 mm in women regardless of age. This assumes usual calibration of 1mV/10mm. These elevations must be present in anatomically contiguous leads. (I, aVL, V5, V6 correspond to the lateral wall; V3-V4 correspond to the anterior wall; V1-V2 correspond to the septal wall; II, III, aVF correspond to the inferior wall.) This criterion is problematic, however, as acute myocardial infarction is not the most common cause of ST segment elevation in chest pain patients. Over 90% of healthy men have at least 1 mm (0.1 mV) of ST segment elevation in at least one precordial lead. The clinician must therefore be well versed in recognizing the so-called ECG mimics of acute myocardial infarction, which include left ventricular hypertrophy, left bundle branch block, paced rhythm, early repolarization, pericarditis, hyperkalemia, and ventricular aneurysm.

Localisation of the occlusion in the ECG showing STEMI changes

There are heavily researched clinical decision tools such as the TIMI Scores which help prognose and diagnose STEMI based on clinical data. For example, TIMI scores are frequently used to take advantage of EKG findings to prognose patients with MI symptoms. Based on symptoms and electrocardiographic findings, practitioners can differentiate between unstable angina, NSTEMI and STEMI, normally in the emergency room setting. Other calculators such as the GRACE and HEART scores, assess other major cardiac events using electrocardiogram findings, both predicting mortality rates for 6 months and 6 weeks, respectively.

== Typical progression ==
Sometimes the earliest presentation of acute myocardial infarction is the hyperacute T wave, which is treated the same as ST segment elevation. Hyperacute T waves must be distinguished from the peaked T waves associated with hyperkalemia.

In the first few hours the ST segments usually begin to rise. Pathological Q waves may appear within hours or may take greater than 24 hr. The T wave will generally become inverted in the first 24 hours, as the ST elevation begins to resolve.

Long term changes of ECG include persistent Q waves (in 90% of cases) and persistent inverted T waves. Persistent ST elevation is rare except in the presence of a ventricular aneurysm.

== See also ==
- Sgarbossa's criteria
