= Tachycardia-dependent bundle branch block =

- Other names: TDBBB

A tachycardia-dependent bundle branch block is a defect in the conduction system of the heart, and is distinct from typical bundle branch blocks due to its reliable, reproducible onset related to an increase in the rate of cardiac contraction. Tachycardia-dependent bundle branch block can prevent both ventricles from contracting efficiently and can limit the cardiac output of the heart.

== Anatomy ==
The human heart is a four-chambered organ responsible for the distribution of blood throughout the body. While every physiological effort is made to ensure that such a vital organ can operate continuously without error, sometimes a pathological situation arises and the function of the heart is compromised. One such pathology arises when the electrical signal propagated throughout the heart (responsible for the heart's highly organized contractions) is hindered, resulting in a degradation of said conduction. This is referred to as a bundle branch block and is seen clinically as rate-dependent bundle branch block, right bundle branch block or left bundle branch block.

=== Normal functioning ===
In a healthy heart, specialized cells in the sinoatrial node are responsible for the generation of contractile stimuli that are directed throughout the heart. A direct neural-like pathway propagates this electrical signal from the SA node through the atrial tissue to a central nodal point in the center of the heart, the atrioventricular node. From here, the signal travels down a signal conducting channel (the bundle of His) where it will diverge into a left and right branch that will control the left and right ventricle, respectively.

== Rate-dependent bundle branch block ==
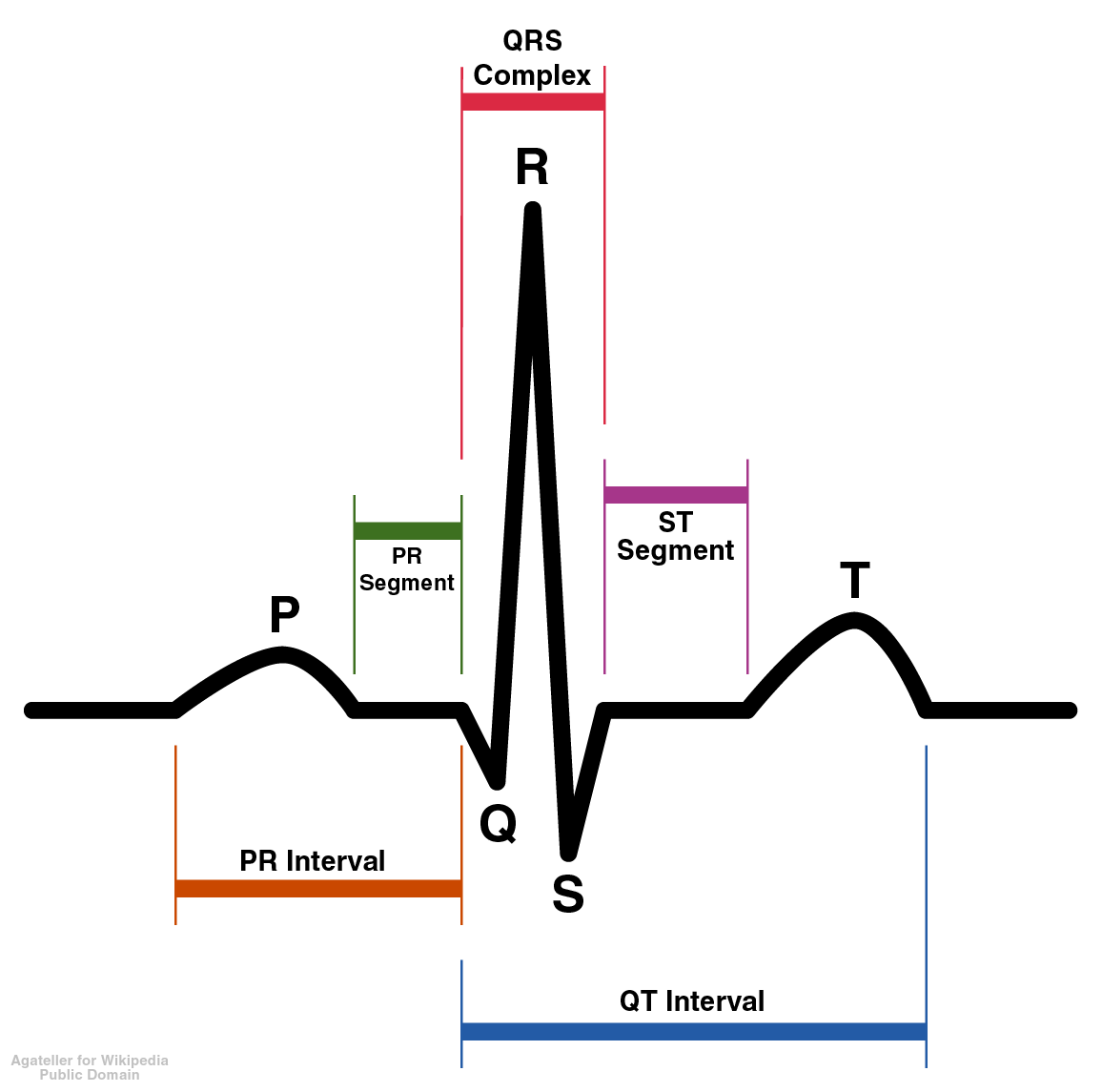
The various components of a normal, healthy ECG tracing.

As a result of underlying heart disease, this cardiac conductive tissue can become damaged from ischemia (a deprivation of oxygenated blood). This damage results in the inability of this neural-like tissue to conduct electrical signals and control the heart as efficiently as before, resulting in the cardiac abnormality known as a bundle branch block (BBB). This can affect either side of the heart, and is described as a right or left BBB. Some BBB are permanent and involve a complete bundle blockage while others are dependent on the underlying activity of the heart. For example, certain situations of excessive or reduced heart rate (tachycardia or bradycardia, respectively) can cause a BBB known as a rate-dependent bundle branch block (RDBBB). This manifests in a similar fashion to a regular bundle branch block, but occurs only under conditions that affect contractile rate. Tachycardia-dependent bundle branch block (TDBBB) can affect either ventricle in the heart, and occurs when the heart's rate of contraction reaches an elevated level and becomes uncoupled from the heart's refractory period (the time it takes for a cardiac cell to "reset" for future contraction). Thus the cell is unable to contract by the time the next electrical stimuli is present, and a blocking of this signal occurs. This prolongation of the refractory period is related to a decreased sodium channel response in damaged tissue that shows an inactivation of sodium channels responsible for repolarization.

== Diagnosis ==
TDBBB can be diagnosed with use of an electrocardiogram (ECG) which will "trace" the electrical activity of the heart, providing an overall view of the hearts electrical system. Typically, TDBBB will be evident on an ECG and manifest as a prolongation of the QRS complex (a QRS complex completion time that exceeds 120ms), notching or slurring of the R wave, or the absence of Q waves should the TDBBB affect the left ventricle.

== Treatment ==
If an affected individual begins to experience severe TDBBB, then medical intervention is often advised. Suggested therapy for the treatment of TDBBB can include the prescription of certain medications or the implantation of a pacemaker device. Advised medications would possess anti-coagulant mechanisms to reduce the risk of blood clot formation ensuring that no further restriction of arteries would deprive the heart of oxygen and further damage the bundle branches. The use of a pacemaker would ensure that the heart receives a constant rhythmic electrical input that never changes in frequency. While this would effectively eliminate the occurrence of TDBBB, the pacemaker would restrict the patient's heart to a permanent rhythm, eliminating the ability of patients to perform physical activity. Future pacemakers that adaptively respond to physiological requirements are being developed in order to negate the limitations observed with their current use.
