= Chromostereopsis =

Visual illusion in color images

Blue–red contrast demonstrating depth perception effects

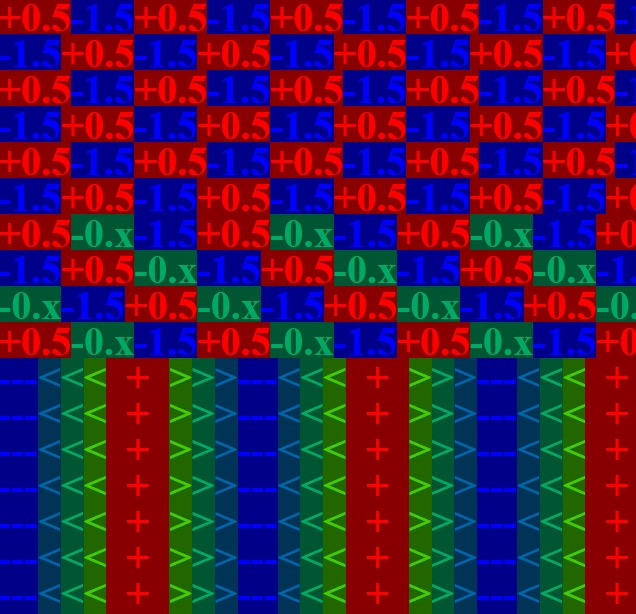
3 Layers of depths "Rivers, Valleys & Mountains"

Chromostereopsis is a visual illusion whereby the impression of depth is conveyed in two-dimensional color images, usually of red–blue or red–green colors, but can also be perceived with red–grey or blue–grey images. Such illusions have been reported for over a century and have generally been attributed to some form of chromatic aberration.

Chromatic aberration results from the differential refraction of light depending on its wavelength, causing some light rays to converge before others in the eye (longitudinal chromatic aberration or LCA) and/or to be located on non-corresponding locations of the two eyes during binocular viewing (transverse chromatic aberration or TCA).

Chromostereopsis is usually observed using a target with red and blue bars and an achromatic background. Positive chromostereopsis is exhibited when the red bars are perceived in front of the blue and negative chromostereopsis is exhibited when the red bars are perceived behind the blue. Several models have been proposed to explain this effect which is often attributed to longitudinal and/or transverse chromatic aberrations. However, some work attributes most of the stereoptic effect to transverse chromatic aberrations in combination with cortical factors.

It has been proposed that chromostereopsis could have evolutionary implications in the development of eyespots in certain butterfly species.

The perceived differences in color's optical power span about 2 diopter (Blue: −1.5, Red +0.5). The effect can appear much more pronounced when suitable images are viewed while wearing eyeglasses needed to correct myopia, with the effect almost completely disappearing when the glasses are removed.

== History ==
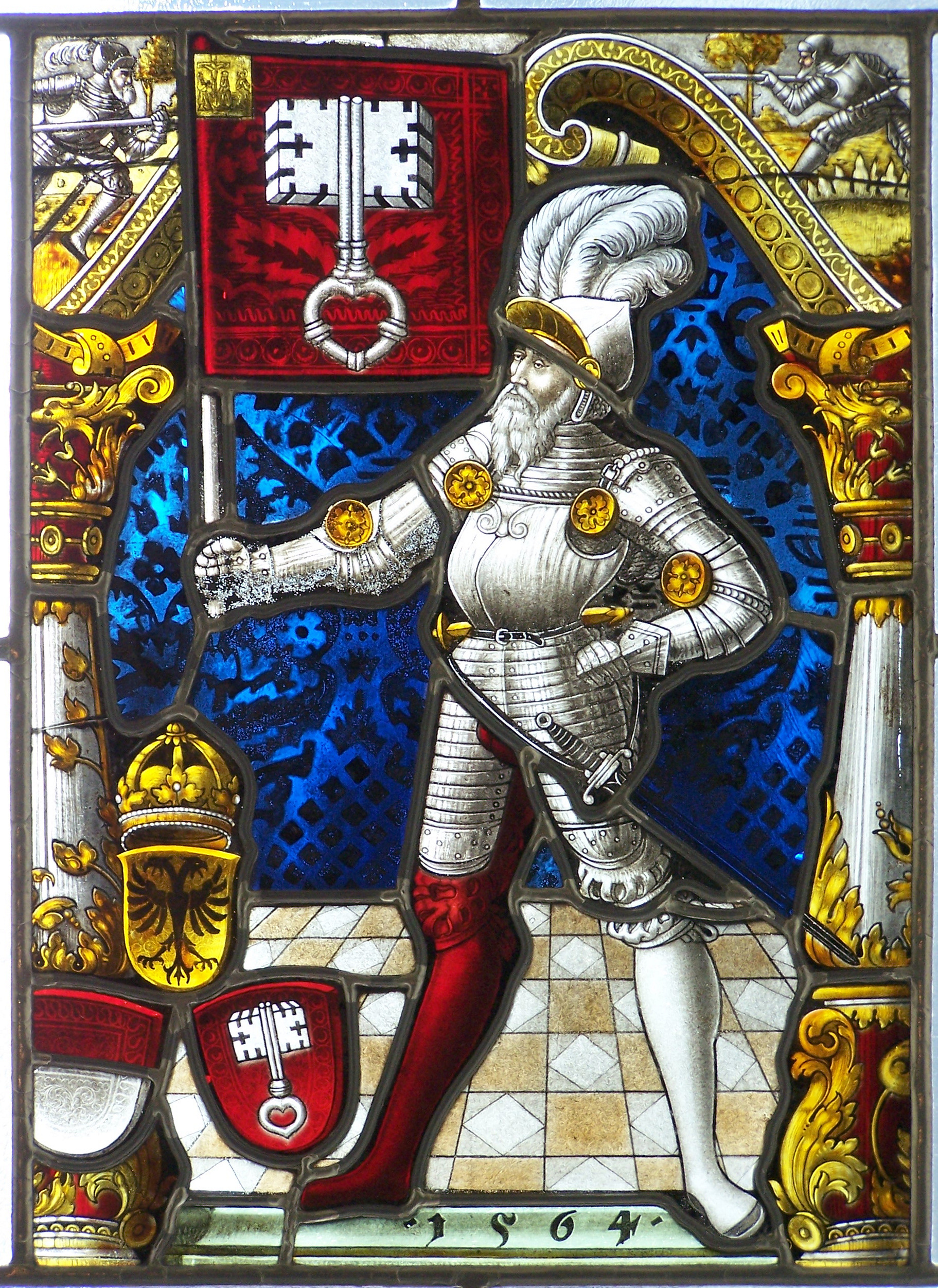
Stained-glass example of chromostereopsis

It is commonly found in stained-glass; historically artists have been aware of this effect, using it to generate advancing or receding perspectives within the images.

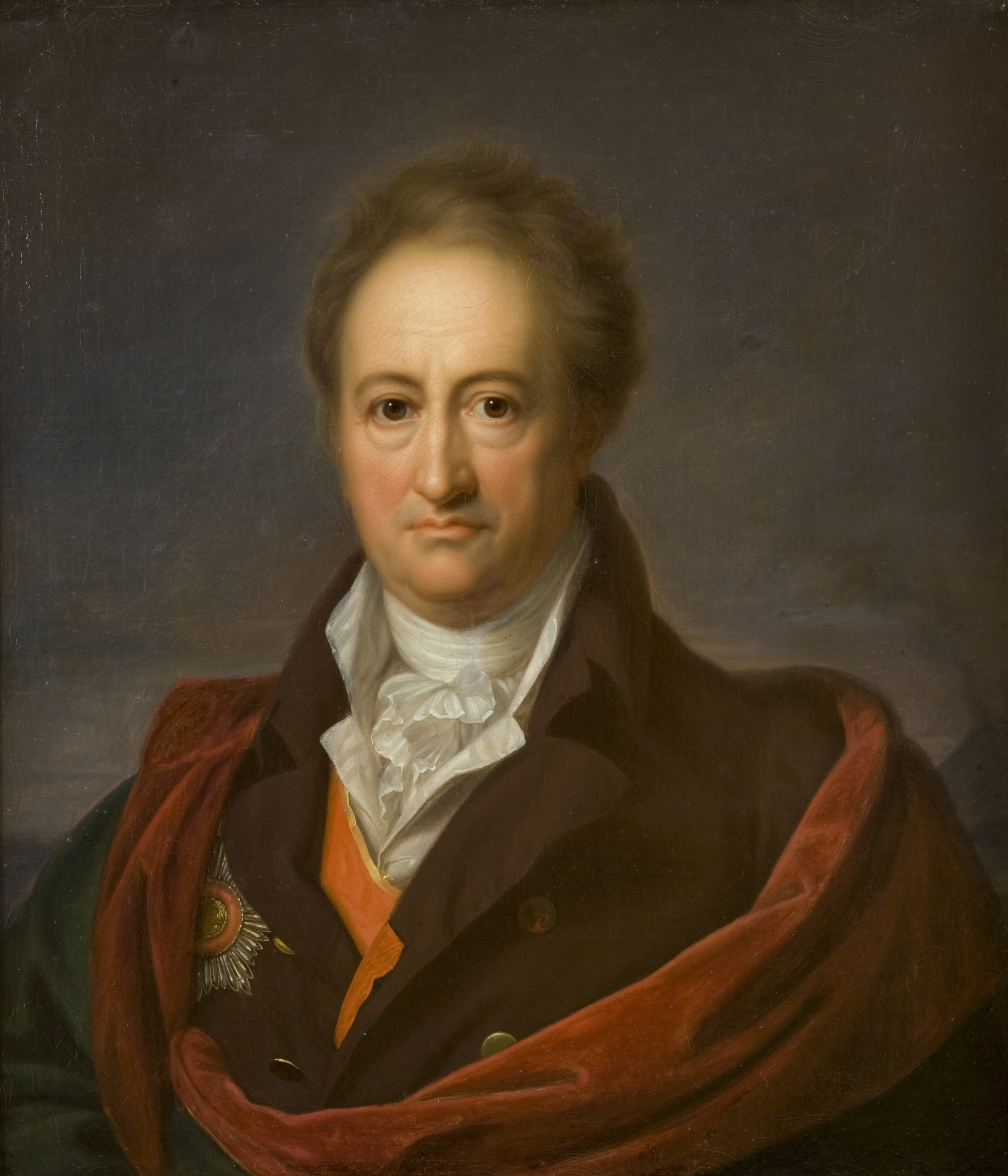
Red–blue contrast was used in a portrait of Goethe

Over two centuries ago, the effect of color depth perception was first noted by Goethe in his Farbenlehre (Theory of Colours) in which he recognized blue as a receding color and yellow/red as a protruding color. He argued that, "like we see the high sky, the far away mountains, as blue, in the same way a blue field seems to recede…(also) One can stare at a perfectly yellow/red field, then the color seems to pierce into the organ". This phenomenon, now referred to as chromostereopsis, or the stereoptic effect, explains the visual science behind this color depth effect, and has many implications for art, media, evolution, as well as our daily lives in how we perceive colors and objects.

Although Goethe did not propose any scientific reasoning behind his observations, in the late 1860s Bruecke and Donders first suggested that the chromostereoptic effect was due to accommodative awareness, given that ocular optics are not achromatic and red objects require more accommodation to be focused on the retina. This notion of accommodation could then be translated into perception of distance. However, what Donders and Bruecke originally missed in their theory is the necessity of binocular observation to produce chromostereopsis. Later, veering off from accommodative awareness, Bruecke proposed that chromatic aberration, along with the temporal off-axis effect of the pupil, can explain the chromostereoptic effect. It is this hypothesis that still forms the basis for our present day understanding of chromostereopsis.

Over the years, art analysis has provided ample evidence of the chromostereoptic effect, but until about thirty years ago little was known about the neurological, anatomical and/or physiological explanation behind the phenomena. For example, in 1958 Dutch art historian De Wilde noted that in analyzing cubist painter Leo Gestel's painting "The Poet Rensburg", instead of using conventional graded depth cues, "If you put violet next to yellow or green next to orange, the violet and the green retreat. In general, the warm colours come forward, and the cool colours retreat". In this sense, the chromostereoptic effect gives shapes plasticity and allows for depth perception through color manipulation.

== Binocular nature of chromostereopsis ==
Schematic diagram of the human eye

The binocular nature of the chromostereopsis was discovered by Bruecke and arises due to the position of the fovea relative to the optical axis. The fovea is located temporally to the optical axis and as a result, the visual axis passes through the cornea with a nasal horizontal eccentricity, meaning that the average ray bound for the fovea must undergo prismatic deviation and is thus subject to chromatic dispersion. The prismatic deviation is in opposite directions in each eye, resulting in opposite color shifts that lead to a shift in stereoptic depth between red and blue objects. The eccentric foveal receptive system, along with the Stiles–Crawford effect, work in opposite directions of one another and roughly cancel out, offering another explanation to why subjects may show color stereoscopy "against the rule" (a reversal of the expected results).

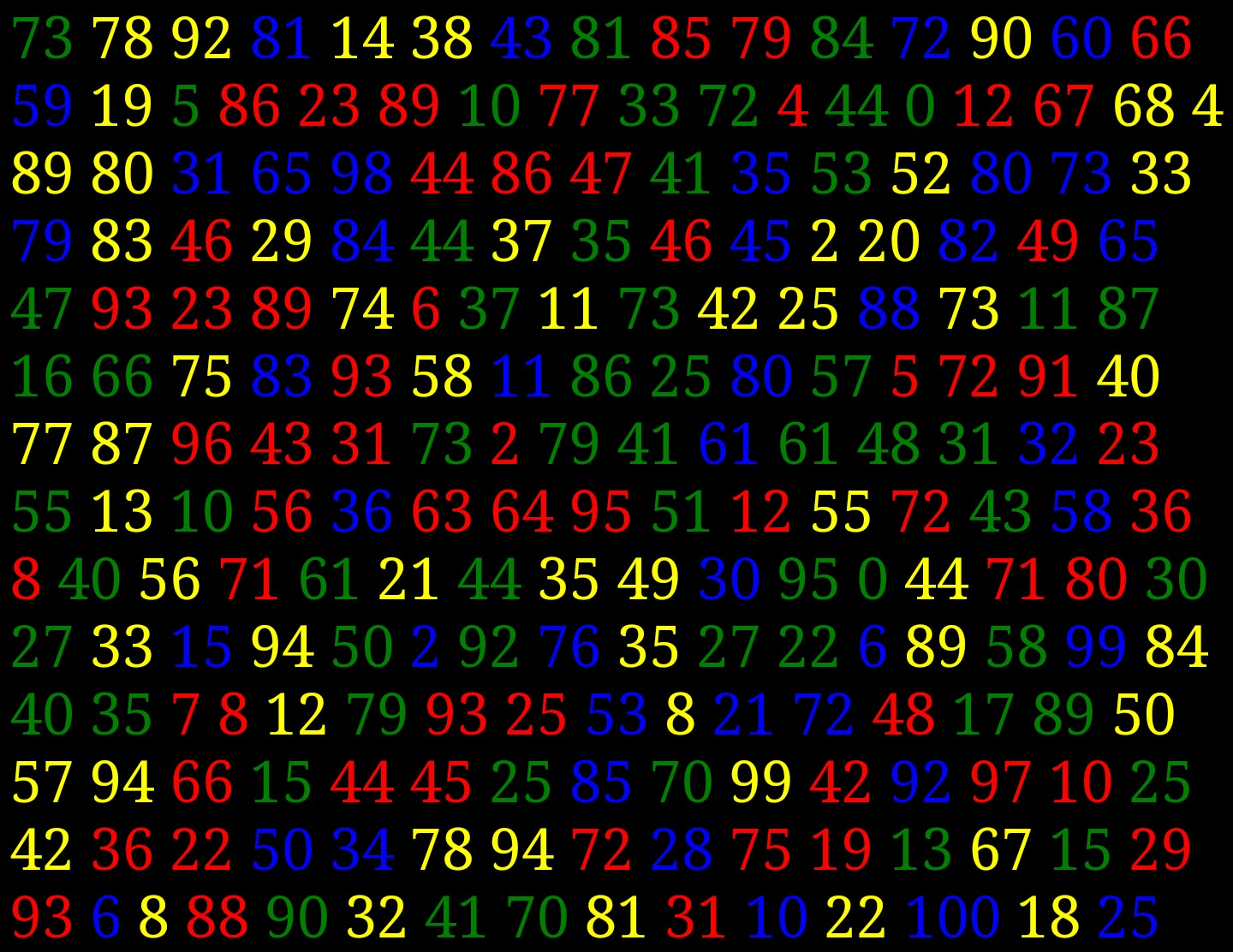
Image that may show four different layers of depth. From near to far: red, yellow, green and blue.

== Reversal effect ==
Evidence for the stereoptic effect is often quite easy to see. For example, when red and blue are viewed side by side on a dark surrounding, most people will view the red as "floating" in front of the blue. However, this is not true for everyone, as some people see the opposite and others no effect at all. This is the same effect that both Goethe and De Wilde had indicated in their observations. While a majority of people will view red as "floating" in front of blue, others experience a reversal of the effect in which they see blue floating in front of the red, or no depth effect at all. While this reversal may appear to discredit chromostereopsis, it does not and instead, as originally proposed by Einthoven, can be explained by an increase in the effect and subsequent reversal via blocking of the eccentric position of the pupil with respect to the optical axis. The diverse nature of the chromostereoptic effect is because the color depth effect is closely intertwined with both perceptual and optical factors. In other words, neither the optical nor the perceptual factors can be taken in isolation to explain chromostereopsis. This multifactorial component of chromostereopsis offers one explanation of the reversal of the effect in different people given the same visual cues.

Reversal effect due to white background

Another interesting reversal effect was observed in 1928 by Verhoeff in which the red bars were perceived as farther away and the blue bars as protruding when the bars are paired on a white background instead of a black background. Verhoeff proposed that this paradoxical reversal can be understood in terms of the pupil's luminance contours (see: Illusory Contours). The pupil has lines of constant luminance efficiency, with each subsequent line marking a 25% decrease in efficiency. Around 1998, Winn and co-workers confirmed Verhoeff's interpretation of this reversal using experiments on different colored backgrounds. Other research has also suggested that border contrast changes could lead to color depth reversal with the switch from black to white backgrounds.

In 1933, Stiles and Crawford discovered that the light sensitivity of the fovea differs significantly for rays entering the eye through the center of the pupil versus rays entering from its peripheral regions. They observed that the usual "intensity multiplied by aperture" rule did not apply in foveal vision and that rays entering the eye via peripheral regions of the pupil were less efficient by roughly a factor of five. This effect is now known as the Stiles–Crawford effect and also has implications for the reverse chromostereoptic effect.

== Theory ==
Red–blue color contrast rectangles

In 1885, Einthoven proposed a theory which states: "The phenomenon (chromostereopsis) is due to chromatic difference of magnification, for since, for example, blue rays are refracted more than red rays by the ocular media, their foci not only lie at different levels (chromatic aberration) but make different angles with the optic axis, and will thus stimulate disparate points. It follows that individuals with temporally eccentric pupils see red in front of blue, while with nasally eccentric pupils the relief is reversed." Einthoven first explained chromatic aberration in the eye, which means that the eyes will not focus all the colors at the same time. Depending on the wavelength, the focal point in the eyes varies. He concluded that the reason why people see red in front of blue is because light with different wavelengths project onto different parts of the retina. When the vision is binocular, a disparity is created, which causes depth perception. Since red is focused temporally, it appears to be in front. However, under monocular vision, this phenomenon is not observed.

However, Bruecke objected to Einthoven's theory on grounds that not all people see red as closer than blue. Einthoven explained that this negative chromostereopsis is probably due to eccentrically positioned pupils because shifting the pupil can change the position of where light wavelengths focus in the eye. Negative chromostereopsis was further studied by Allen and Rubin who suggested that changing the angle between the pupillary center and visual axis can change the direction of chromostereopsis. If the pupillary center is located temporal to the visual axis, red will appear closer. The reverse effect is observed when the pupillary center is nasal to the visual axis.

== Stiles–Crawford effect ==
Research has attempted to extend the basis for the traditional chromostereoptic theory, including work done by Stiles and Crawford. In 1933, Stiles and Crawford accidentally discovered that the light sensitivity differed for rays entering through center versus those entering from peripheral regions of the eye. The efficiency of the rays is less when the rays enter via the peripheral region because the shape of the cone cells that collect the incident quanta are different from cone receptors in the center of the eye. This effect can cause both positive and negative chromostereopsis depending on the position of the pupil. If the pupil is centered on optical axis, it causes positive chromostereopsis. However, if the pupil is significantly off-center from the optical axis, negative chromostereopsis will ensue. Because most people have a point of maximum luminous efficiency that is off-center, the Stiles–Crawford effects generally will have antagonistic chromostereoptic effects. Therefore, instead of seeing red in front of blue, blue will be seen in front of red and the effect will be reversed. The Stiles–Crawford effect also explains why positive chromostereopsis is decreased when illumination is lowered. At lower illumination, the dilation of pupil increases the pupillary peripheral region and therefore increases the magnitude of the Stiles–Crawford effect.

== Chromatic aberration ==
Comparison of an ideal image of a ring (1) and ones with only axial (2) and only transverse (3) chromatic aberration

Stereoptic depth perception obtained from two dimensional red and blue or red and green images is believed to be caused primarily by optical chromatic aberrations. Chromatic aberrations are defined as types of optical distortions that occur as a consequence of refracting properties of the eye. However, other [optical] factors, image characteristics, and perceptual factors also play a role in color depth effects under natural viewing conditions. Additionally, texture properties of the stimulus can also play a role.

Newton first demonstrated the presence of chromatic aberration in the human eye in 1670. He observed that isolated incident light rays directed at an opaque card held close to the eye strike the refracting surfaces of the eye obliquely and are therefore strongly refracted. Because the indices of refraction (see: Refractive Index) vary inversely with wavelength, blue rays (short wavelength) will be refracted more than red rays (long wavelength). This phenomenon is called chromatic dispersion and has important implications for the optical performance of the eye, including the stereoptic effect. For example, Newton noted that such chromatic dispersion causes the edges of a white object to be tinged with color.

Modern accounts of chromatic aberrations divide ocular chromatic aberrations into two main categories; longitudinal chromatic aberration (LCA), and transverse chromatic aberration (TCA).

=== Longitudinal chromatic aberration ===
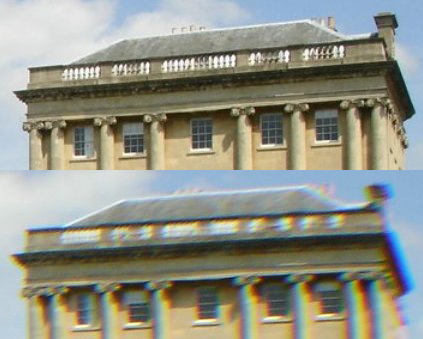
Chromatic aberration comparison: Top image shows a photo taken with a built-in lens of digital camera (Sony V3). Bottom photo taken with the same camera, but with additional wide angle lens. The effect of aberration is visible around the dark edges (especially on the right).

LCA is defined as the "variation of the eye's focusing power for different wavelengths". This chromatic difference varies from about 400 nm to 700 nm across the visible spectrum. In LCA, the refracting properties of the eye cause light rays of shorter wavelengths, such as blue, to converge before longer wavelength colors.

=== Transverse chromatic aberration ===
TCA is defined as the variation in angle between the refracted chief rays for different wavelengths. Chief rays, in this case, refer to rays from a point source that passes through the center of the pupil. Unlike LCA, TCA depends on object location in the visual field and pupil position within the eye. Object location determines the angle of incidence of the selected rays. By Snell's Law of Refraction, this incidence angle subsequently determines the amount of chromatic dispersion and thus location of the retinal images for different wavelengths of light. In TCA, different wavelengths of light are displaced in non-corresponding retinal positions of each eye during binocular viewing. The chromostereoptic effect is generally attributed to the interocular difference in TCA. Color-induced depth effects due to TCA can only be perceived in images containing achromatic information and a single non-achromatic color. The amplitude of the perceived depth in an image due to the stereoptic effect can be predicted from the amount of induced TCA. In other words, as the pupillary distance from the foveal achromatic axis is increased, perceived depth also increases.

=== Implications of chromatic aberrations ===
Longitudinal and transverse chromatic aberrations work together to affect retinal image quality. Additionally, pupil displacement from the visual axis is critical for determining the magnitude of the aberration under natural viewing conditions. In chromostereopsis, if the pupils of the two eyes are displaced temporally from the visual axis, then blue rays from a point source will intersect the retinae on the nasal side of red rays from the same source. This induced ocular disparity makes blue rays appear to come from a more distant source than red rays.

== Evolutionary significance ==
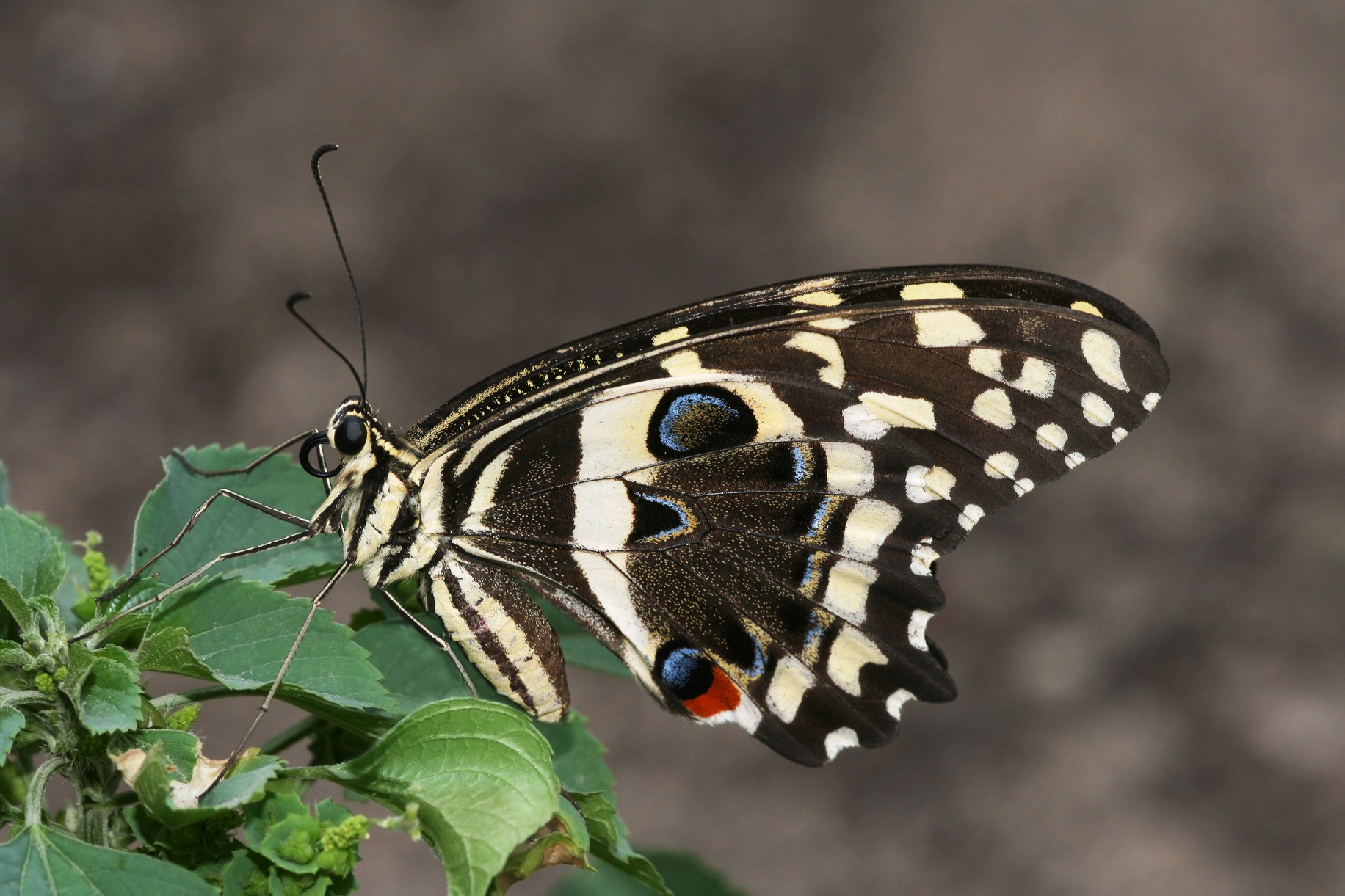
Citrus Swallowtail Papilio demodocus

Chromostereopsis may also have evolutionary implications for predators and prey, giving it historical and practical significance. Possible evidence for the evolutionary significance of chromostereopsis is given in the fact that the fovea has developed in the lateral eyes of hunted animals to have a very large angle between the optical axis and visual axis to attain at least some binocular field of view. For these hunted animals, their eyes serve to detect predatory animals, which explains their lateral position in order to give them a full panoramic field of view. In contrast, this observed foveal development is opposite in predators and in primates. Predators and primates depend primarily on binocular vision, and therefore their eyes developed to be frontal in position. The angle between their optical and visual axis, therefore, can be reduced to almost negligible values, down to about five degrees in humans.

Butterflies may also have taken evolutionary advantage of chromostereopsis in developing distinctive "eye" patterns, which are presented on their wings. These eyespots can appear as being forward or receding in depth based on their color pattern, producing an effect of protruding or receding eyes, respectively. Natural selection may have developed these color and texture schemas because it produces the illusion of protruding or receding eyes of much larger organisms than the actual butterfly, keeping potential predators at bay.

Yet another evolutionary example of chromostereopsis comes from cuttlefish. It has been suggested that cuttlefish estimate the distance of prey via stereopsis. Additional evidence suggests that their choice of camouflage is also sensitive to visual depth based on color-induced depth effects.

== Methods of testing ==
Many different methods of testing have been employed to view the effects of chromostereopsis on depth perception in humans. Technological progress has allowed for accurate, efficient, and more conclusive testing, in relation to the past, where individuals would merely observe the occurrence.

In one method, twenty-five control subjects were tested using color-based depth effects through the use of five different colored pairs of squares. The different colors were blue, red, green, cyan and yellow. Subjects were placed in a dark room and the colored square stimuli were presented for 400 milliseconds each, and during this time the subjects were asked to attend to either the right or left square (evenly counterbalanced across subjects). Using a joystick, the subject indicated whether the square was behind, in front of, or in the same plane as its pair. According to the theory, the longer the wavelength of the color, the closer it should be perceived by the observer for positive chromostereopsis. Having a longer wavelength than the other colors, red should appear closest. To enhance this effect, subjects put on blazed grating High Definition ChromaDepth® C3D™ 3D-lenses glasses, which contain a prism structure to refract the light to an angle of approximately 1° and were tested again.

The use of electrodes to test brain activity is another, relatively new way to test for chromostereopsis. This form of testing utilizes EEG recordings of visual-evoked potentials through the use of electrodes. In one experiment, subjects were shown different stimuli in regard to color-contrast and were asked questions about its depth, as before. The electrodes attached to the subjects subsequently collected data while the experiment occurred.

Another more routinely used technique tests the subject's extent of chromatic aberration. In one such experiment, slits placed before the subject's eyes measured the chromatic dispersion of the eyes as a function of the separation of the slits. Prisms in front of the eyes determined the separation of the visual and null axes. The product of these separate measurements predicted the apparent depth expected with full-pupil stereoscopy. Agreement was good with expected results, supplying additional evidence that chromostereopsis depends on chromatic dispersion.

Other experimental techniques can be used to test for reverse chromostereopsis, an occurrence seen by a minority of the population. The direction of chromostereopsis can be reversed by moving both artificial pupils in a nasal direction or temporal direction with respect to the centers of the natural pupils. Moving the artificial pupils nasally induces blue-in-front-of-red stereopsis and moving them temporally has the opposite effect. This is because moving the pupil changes the position of the optic axis, but not the visual axis, thus changing the sign of transverse chromatic aberration. Therefore, changes in the magnitude and sign of transverse chromatic aberration brought about by changing the lateral distance between small artificial pupils are accompanied by equivalent changes in chromostereopsis.

== Research ==
While a lot of physiological mechanisms that cause chromostereopsis have been discovered and researched, there are still unanswered questions. For example, many researchers believe that chromostereopsis is caused by combination of multiple factors. Because of this, some research has attempted to investigate how the different luminescence of backgrounds and different luminescence of red and blue color affect the chromostereoptic effect.

Additionally, previous studies have taken a psychophysical approach to studying chromostereopsis in order to document it as a perceptual effect and observe its optic mechanisms, but no studies had examined the neurophysiological basis of chromostereopsis.

A neurophysiological study by Cauquil et al. describes V1 and V2 color-preferring cells as coding local image characteristics (such as binocular disparity) and surface properties of a 3D scene, respectively. The study conducted by Cauquil et al. indicates, based on electrode stimulation results, that both dorsal and ventral pathways in the brain are involved in chromostereoptic processing. This study also concluded that chromostereopsis starts in the early stages of visual cortical processing, first in the occipito-parietal region of the brain, followed by a second step in the right parietal area and temporal lobes. Additionally, activity was found to be greater in the right hemisphere, which is dominant for 3D cortical processing, indicating that chromostereopsis is a task-dependent, top-down effect. Overall, chromostereopsis involves cortical areas that underlie depth processing for both monocular and binocular cues.
