= Sgarbossa's criteria =

- Sinus rhythm; first-degree AV block; LBBB; inferior STEMI equivalent - OMI Right ventricular apical paced rhythm; inferior STEMI equivalent - OMI
- Purpose: identify myocardial infarction

Sgarbossa's criteria are a set of electrocardiographic findings generally used to identify myocardial infarction (also called acute myocardial infarction or a "heart attack") in the presence of a left bundle branch block (LBBB) or a ventricular paced rhythm.

Myocardial infarction (MI) is often difficult to detect when LBBB is present on ECG. A large clinical trial of thrombolytic therapy for MI (GUSTO-1) evaluated the electrocardiographic diagnosis of evolving MI in the presence of LBBB. The rule was defined by Dr. Elena Sgarbossa, Argentine- born American cardiologist. Among 26,003 North American patients who had a myocardial infarction confirmed by enzyme studies, 131 (0.5%) had LBBB. A scoring system, now commonly called Sgarbossa criteria, was developed from the coefficients assigned by a logistic model for each independent criterion, on a scale of 0 to 5. A minimal score of 3 was required for a specificity of 90%.

== Sgarbossa's criteria ==
Three criteria are included in Sgarbossa's criteria:

- ST elevation ≥1 mm in a lead with a positive QRS complex (i.e.: concordance) - 5 points
- concordant ST depression ≥1 mm in lead V1, V2, or V3 - 3 points
- ST elevation ≥5 mm in a lead with a negative (discordant) QRS complex - 2 points

≥3 points = 90% specificity of STEMI (sensitivity of 36%)

== Usefulness ==
A high take-off of the ST segment in leads V1 to V3 is well-described with uncomplicated LBBB, such as in the setting of left ventricular hypertrophy. In a substudy from the ASSENT 2 and 3 trials, the third criteria added little diagnostic or prognostic value.

A Sgarbossa score of ≥3 was specific but not sensitive (36%) in the validation sample in the original report. A subsequent meta-analysis of 10 studies consisting of 1614 patients showed that a Sgarbossa score of ≥3 had a specificity of 98% and sensitivity of 20%. The sensitivity may increase if serial or previous ECGs are available.

== Other methods for detecting AMI in patients with LBBB ==
Several other studies have evaluated the usefulness of different ECG findings in diagnosing MI when LBBB is present. Smith et al. modified Sgarbossa's original criteria.

Smith-modified Sgarbossa rule:

- at least one lead with concordant STE (Sgarbossa criterion 1) or
- at least one lead of V1-V3 with concordant ST depression (Sgarbossa criterion 2) or
- proportionally excessively discordant ST elevation in V1-V4, as defined by an ST/S ratio of equal to or more than 0.20 and at least 2 mm of STE. (this replaces Sgarbossa criterion 3 which uses an absolute of 5mm)

Wackers et al. correlated ECG changes in LBBB with localization of the infarct by thallium scintigraphy. The most useful ECG criteria were:

- Serial ECG changes — 67 percent sensitivity
- ST segment elevation — 54 percent sensitivity
- Abnormal Q waves — 31 percent sensitivity
- Cabrera's sign — 27 percent sensitivity, 47 percent for anteroseptal MI
- Initial positivity in V1 with a Q wave in V6 — 20 percent sensitivity but 100 percent specificity for anteroseptal MI

== See also ==
- Electrocardiography in myocardial infarction
