= LAH =

LAH may refer to:

- Last Action Hero, a 1993 American action-comedy film
- Left anterior hemiblock, a cardiovascular disease
- Leigh Ann Hester, an American soldier during the Iraq War who was awarded the Silver Star medal
- Licentiate of Apothecaries' Hall, a medical qualification awarded in Dublin, Ireland until early 1970s
- Lithium aluminium hydride, an inorganic compound used as a reducing agent
- 1st SS Panzer Division Leibstandarte SS Adolf Hitler, Adolf Hitler's bodyguard unit which eventually grew into an elite Waffen-SS division during World War II
- Lord Alfred Hayes, English professional wrestler, manager and commentator, best known for his appearances in the United States with the World Wrestling Federation between 1982 and 1995.
- Lysergic acid hydroxyethylamide (LSH or LAH), an alkaloid and possible psychedelic drug
