= Bifascicular block =

Conduction abnormality in the heart

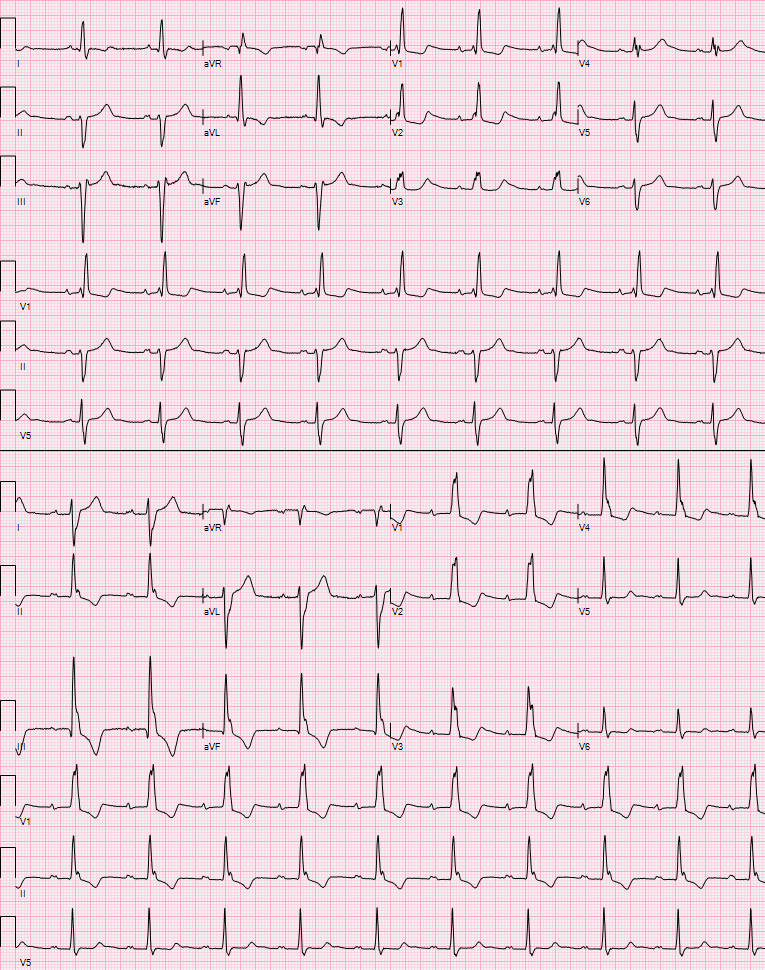
- Two consecutive 12-lead ECGs recorded one minute apart on a symptomatic 82-year old male with Lev's disease. (Top) RBBB+LAFB. (Bottom) RBBB+LPFB+1°AVB.
- Specialty: Cardiology

Bifascicular block is characterized by right bundle branch block with left anterior fascicular block, or right bundle branch block with left posterior fascicular block on electrocardiography. Complete heart block could be the cause of syncope that is otherwise unexplained if bifascicular block is seen on electrocardiography. It is estimated that less than 50% of patients with bifascicular block have high-degree atrioventricular block, although the exact incidence is unknown.

The European Society of Cardiology (ESC) suggests using electrophysiology studies for diagnostic purposes (EPS). When pharmacologic stress or incremental atrial pacing induces high-degree atrioventricular block, a permanent pacemaker (PPM) is recommended. If EPS is negative, long-term rhythm monitoring with an implantable loop recorder (ILR) is advised.

Most commonly, it refers to a combination of right bundle branch block (RBBB) and either left anterior fascicular block (LAFB) or left posterior fascicular block (LPFB), with the former being more common.

== Signs and symptoms ==
Patients who suffer from bifascicular block are more likely to experience syncope and unexpected death.

== Treatment ==
In those with bifascicular block and no symptoms, little with respect to treatment is needed. In those with syncope, a pacemaker is recommended.

== See also ==
- Trifascicular block
- Bundle branch block
