= LAFB =

LAFB may refer to:

- Langley Air Force Base
- Laredo Air Force Base
- Left anterior fascicular block
- Luke Air Force Base
