= Bundle branch block =

Restriction of electrical impulse flow in the heart's bundle branches

- ECG showing a bundle branch block
- Specialty: Cardiology
- Diagnostic method: Electrocardiogram

A bundle branch block is a partial or complete interruption in the flow of electrical impulses in either of the bundle branches of the heart's electrical system.

== Anatomy and physiology ==
This image shows bundle branch block where the beating rhythm is hindered, but not stopped. A blockage in Site A in the left ventricle blocks electrical signals from the atrium, causing the heart to rely on the right ventricle to maintain the correct rhythm. A:obstruction B:sinus node C:atrioventricular (AV) node 1:right atrium 2:left atrium 3:left ventricle 4:right ventricle

The heart's electrical activity begins in the sinoatrial node (the heart's natural pacemaker), which is situated on the upper right atrium. The impulse travels next through the left and right atria and summates at the atrioventricular node. From the AV node the electrical impulse travels down the bundle of His and divides into the right and left bundle branches. The right bundle branch contains one fascicle. The left bundle branch subdivides into two fascicles: the left anterior fascicle, and the left posterior fascicle.

Other sources divide the left bundle branch into three fascicles: the left anterior, the left posterior, and the left septal fascicle. The thicker left posterior fascicle bifurcates, with one fascicle being in the septal aspect. Ultimately, the fascicles divide into millions of Purkinje fibres, which in turn interdigitate with individual cardiac myocytes, allowing for rapid, coordinated, and synchronous physiologic depolarization of the ventricles.

== Mechanism ==
When a bundle branch or fascicle becomes injured (by underlying heart disease, myocardial infarction, or cardiac surgery), it may cease to conduct electrical impulses appropriately. This results in altered pathways for ventricular depolarization. Since the electrical impulse can no longer use the preferred pathway across the bundle branch, it may move instead through muscle fibers in a way that both slows the electrical movement and changes the directional propagation of the impulses.

As a result, there is a loss of ventricular synchrony, ventricular depolarization is prolonged, and there may be a corresponding drop in cardiac output. When heart failure is present, a specialized pacemaker may be used to resynchronize the ventricles. In theory a pacemaker like this will shorten the QRS interval, thus bringing the timing of contraction of the left and right ventricles closer together and slightly increasing the ejection fraction.

== Diagnosis ==
A bundle branch block can be diagnosed when the duration of the QRS complex on the ECG exceeds 120 ms. A right bundle branch block typically causes prolongation of the last part of the QRS complex and may shift the heart's electrical axis slightly to the right. The ECG will show a terminal R wave in lead V1 and a slurred S wave in lead I. Left bundle branch block widens the entire QRS, and in most cases shifts the heart's electrical axis to the left. The ECG will show a QS or rS complex in lead V1 and a monophasic R wave in lead I. Another normal finding with bundle branch block is appropriate T wave discordance. In other words, the T wave will be deflected opposite the terminal deflection of the QRS complex. Bundle branch block, especially left bundle branch block, can lead to cardiac dyssynchrony. The simultaneous occurrence of left and right bundle branch block leads to total AV block.

=== Types ===
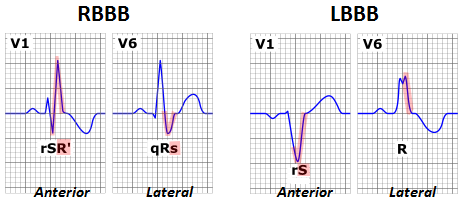
Image showing the ECG characteristics of a right bundle branch block and a left bundle branch block. In both cases, the late portion of the widened QRS complex arises from an anomalously conducted depolarization impulse. The direction of this delayed depolarization vector differs based on the structure that is blocked; the impulse travels anterior toward the right ventricle in RBBB and lateral toward the left ventricle in LBBB.

Depending on the anatomical location of the defect which leads to a bundle branch block, the blocks are further classified into:

- Right bundle branch block, incomplete (IRBBB) or complete (CRBBB)
- Left bundle branch block, incomplete (iLBBB) or complete (cLBBB)

The left bundle branch block can be further sub classified into:

- Left anterior fascicular block. In this case only the anterior half of the left bundle branch (fascicle) is involved
- Left posterior fascicular block. Only the posterior part of the left bundle branch is involved

Other classifications of bundle branch blocks are;

- Bifascicular block. This is a combination of right bundle branch block (RBBB) and either left anterior fascicular block (LAFB) or left posterior fascicular block (LPFB)
- Trifascicular block. This is a combination of right bundle branch block with either left anterior fascicular block or left posterior fascicular block together with a first degree AV block.
- Tachycardia-dependent bundle branch block

A simple way to quickly differentiate between the two types is to note the deflection of the QRS complex in the V1 lead. A (V1) QRS segment deflected down indicates left bundle branch block, while a deflection up indicates right bundle branch block. In both types, the QRS is wide (> 0.12 seconds).

== Treatment ==
Some people with bundle branch blocks are born with this condition. Many others acquire it as a consequence of heart disease. People with bundle branch blocks may still be quite active, and may have nothing more remarkable than an abnormal appearance to their ECG. However, when bundle blocks are complex and diffuse in the bundle systems, or are associated with additional and significant ventricular muscle damage, they may be a sign of serious underlying heart disease. In more severe cases, a pacemaker may be required to restore an optimal electrical supply to the heart muscle.

== See also ==
- Cardiac pacemaker
- Heart block
- First degree AV block
- Second degree AV block
- Third degree AV block
