= Trifascicular block =

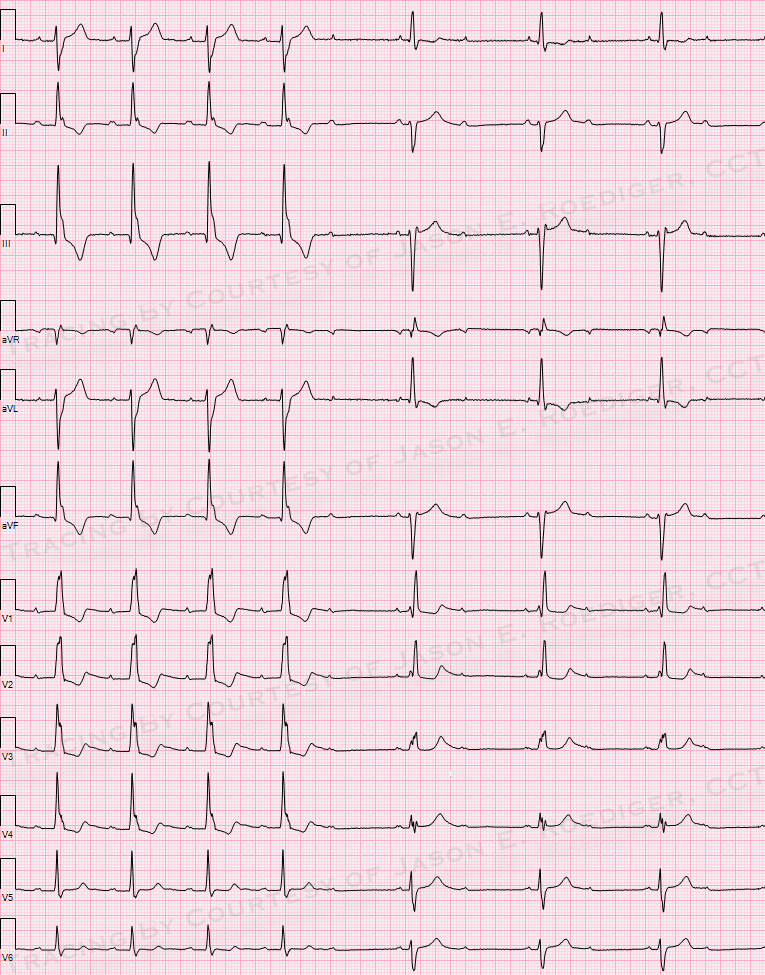
- Specialty: Cardiology

Trifascicular block is a problem with the electrical conduction of the heart, specifically the three fascicles of the bundle branches that carry electrical signals from the atrioventricular node to the ventricles. The three fascicles are one in the right bundle branch, and two in the left bundle branch the left anterior fascicle and the left posterior fascicle. A block at any of these levels can cause an abnormality to show on an electrocardiogram.

The most literal meaning of trifascicular block is complete heart block: all three fascicles are blocked. A second, and clinically distinct, definition of trifascicular block is a circumstance in which right bundle branch block (RBBB) and left bundle branch block occur in the same patient, but at distinct points in time. For example, a patient that is found to have a RBBB one day and a LBBB another can be said to have "alternating bundle branch blocks". In this context, because all three fascicles show evidence of block at different points in time, the term trifascicular block is often used.

Finally, the third meaning of trifascicular block refers to a specific finding on an electrocardiogram in which bifascicular block is observed in a patient with a prolonged PR interval (first degree AV block).

The treatment of trifascicular block is highly dependent on which clinical entity (one of the three above) is being described.

== Diagnosis ==
An electrophysiology study of the conduction system can help discern the severity of conduction system disease. In an electrophysiology study, trifascicular block due to AV nodal disease is represented by a prolonged AH interval (denoting prolonged time from impulse generation in the atria and conduction to the bundle of His) with a relatively preserved HV interval (denoting normal conduction from the bundle of His to the ventricles). Trifascicular block due to distal conduction system disease is represented by a normal AH interval and a prolonged HV interval. In the absence of symptoms, a prolonged AH interval is likely benign while a prolonged HV interval is almost always pathologic.

== Treatment ==
An implantable cardiac pacemaker or permanent pacemaker is recommended in the following clinical circumstances. Class 1 recommendation is the strongest recommendation. Level A evidence is the highest level of evidence.

Class I

- Bifascicular block + complete heart block, even in the absence of symptoms (1b)
- Bifascicular block + 2nd degree AV Block Type 2, even in the absence of symptoms (1b)
- Alternating bundle branch blocks, even in the absence of symptoms (1c)

Class II

- Bifascicular block + syncope + alternative causes ruled out (e.g. orthostasis, arrhythmia) (2a)

Class III (i.e. pacemaker not recommended)

- Bifascicular block without symptoms
- Bifascicular block + 1st degree AV Block, without symptoms
