= Intrinsicoid deflection =

Electrocardiogram downstroke

In the electrocardiogram, the intrinsicoid deflection is the downstroke of the QRS complex, from its highest amplitude until it reaches the baseline or lower. Since the ventricles normally depolarize from inside to outside, this deflection reflects the depolarization vector from the endocardium to the epicardium. The time of the onset of the intrinsicoid deflection, also referred to as the ventricular activation time or R wave peak time, is measured from the beginning of the QRS complex to the peak of the R wave.

In the presence of bundle branch block or ventricular hypertrophy, the depolarization impulse takes a longer than normal period of time to reach the recording electrode. This delays the onset of the intrinsicoid deflection. This prolongation or delay is an important criterion for diagnosing bundle branch block or ventricular hypertrophy. Time of onset of intrinsicoid deflection > 0.04 seconds (just over one small box) is used as a non-voltage related criterion to diagnose left ventricular hypertrophy.
