= Left without being seen =

Left Without Being Seen (LWBS) is a healthcare term often used by emergency departments (ED) to designate a patient encounter that ended with the patient leaving the healthcare setting before the patient could be seen by a certified physician. Often the inclusion of this phrase in a medical record is the result of ED overcrowding (i.e. the patient could no longer wait in the ED to be seen by a physician, so they left without alerting a healthcare professional). Typically, those patients who leave an emergency department without being seen are not at an increased risk of death, and often do not require inpatient hospital admission. An increase in LWBS patients may be reflective of systemic public healthcare logistical issues.
