= QRS complex =

Electrocardiogram waveform representing ventricular contraction in the heart

Schematic representation of a normal sinus rhythm ECG wave.

Diagram showing how the polarity of the QRS complex in leads I, II, and III can be used to estimate the heart's electrical axis in the frontal plane.

The QRS complex is the combination of three of the graphical deflections seen on a typical electrocardiogram (ECG or EKG). It is usually the central and most visually obvious part of the tracing. It corresponds to the depolarization of the right and left ventricles of the heart and contraction of the large ventricular muscles.

In adults, the QRS complex normally lasts 80 to 100 ms; in children it may be shorter. The Q, R, and S waves occur in rapid succession, do not all appear in all leads, and reflect a single event and thus are usually considered together. A Q wave is any downward deflection immediately following the P wave. An R wave follows as an upward deflection, and the S wave is any downward deflection after the R wave. The T wave follows the S wave, and in some cases, an additional U wave follows the T wave.

To measure the QRS interval start at the end of the PR interval (or beginning of the Q wave) to the end of the S wave. Normally this interval is 0.08 to 0.10 seconds. When the duration is longer it is considered a wide QRS complex.

== Formation ==
Depolarization of the heart ventricles occurs almost simultaneously, via the bundle of His and Purkinje fibers. If they are working efficiently, the QRS complex duration in adults is 80 to 110 ms.

== Clinical significance ==
Any abnormality of conduction takes longer and causes "widened" QRS complexes, sometimes called cardiac aberrancy. In bundle branch block, there can be an abnormal second upward deflection within the QRS complex. In this case, such a second upward deflection is referred to as R′ (pronounced "R prime"). This would be described as an RSR′ pattern.

Ventricles contain more muscle mass than the atria. Therefore, the QRS complex is considerably larger than the P wave. The QRS complex is often used to determine the axis of the electrocardiogram, although it is also possible to determine a separate P wave axis.

The duration, amplitude, and morphology of the QRS complex are useful in diagnosing cardiac arrhythmias, conduction abnormalities, ventricular hypertrophy, myocardial infarction, electrolyte derangements, and other disease states.

High frequency analysis of the QRS complex may be useful for detection of coronary artery disease during an exercise stress test.

== Components ==
Schematic representation of the QRS complex.

Parameter	Normal value	Value comments	Clinical significance
QRS duration	75 to 105 ms	Shorter in children	Prolonged duration could indicate hyperkalemia or intraventricular conduction delay such as bundle branch block.
QRS amplitude	S amplitude in V1 + R amplitude in V5 < 3.5 millivolt (mV); R+S in a precordial lead < 4.5 mV; R in V5 or V6 < 2.6 mV		Increased amplitude indicates cardiac hypertrophy
Ventricular activation time (VAT)	< 50 ms in V5 or V6; < 30 ms in V1		Measured in increased QRS amplitude
Q wave	Duration up to 40 ms in leads other than III and aVR; Amplitude less than 1/3 QRS amplitude (R+S); Amplitude less than 1/4 of R wave		Abnormality indicates presence of infarction
R wave	Left ventricle: lead V5 or V6 < 45 ms; Right ventricle: lead V1 or V2 < 35 ms		Large amplitude might indicate of left ventricular hypertrophy Duration longer than 45 ms might indicate left posterior fascicular block, LVH or LBBB.
S wave			Large amplitude might indicate of left ventricular hypertrophy

=== Q wave ===
Normal Q waves, when present, represent depolarization of the interventricular septum. For this reason, they are referred to as septal Q waves and can be appreciated in the lateral leads I, aVL, V5 and V6.

Pathologic Q waves occur when the electrical signal passes through stunned or scarred heart muscle; as such, they are usually markers of previous myocardial infarctions, with subsequent fibrosis. A pathologic Q wave is defined as having a deflection amplitude of 25% or more of the subsequent R wave, or being > 0.04 s (40 ms) in width and > 2 mm in amplitude. However, diagnosis requires the presence of this pattern in more than one corresponding lead.

=== R wave progression ===
Looking at the precordial leads, the R wave usually progresses from showing an rS-type complex in V_{1} with an increasing R and a decreasing S wave when moving toward the left side. There is usually a qR-type of complex in V_{5} and V_{6,} with the R-wave amplitude usually taller in V_{5} than in V_{6}. It is normal to have a narrow QS and rSr' patterns in V_{1}, and this is also the case for qRs and R patterns in V_{5} and V_{6}. The transition zone is where the QRS complex changes from predominantly negative to predominantly positive (R/S ratio becoming >1), and this usually occurs at V_{3} or V_{4}. It is normal to have the transition zone at V_{2} (called "early transition") and at V_{5} (called "delayed transition"). In biomedical engineering, the maximum amplitude in the R wave is usually called "R peak amplitude", or just "R peak". Accurate R peak detection is essential in signal processing equipment for heart rate measurement and it is the main feature used for arrhythmia detection.

The definition of poor R wave progression (PRWP) varies in the literature. It may be defined, for example, as R wave of less than 2–4 mm in leads V_{3} or V_{4} and/or presence of a reversed R wave progression, which is defined as R in V_{4} < R in V_{3} or R in V_{3} < R in V_{2} or R in V_{2} < R in V_{1}, or any combination of these. Poor R wave progression is commonly attributed to anterior myocardial infarction, but it may also be caused by left bundle branch block, Wolff–Parkinson–White syndrome, right and left ventricular hypertrophy, or a faulty ECG recording technique.

=== R wave peak time ===
R wave peak time (RWPT) represents the time from the onset of QRS complex to the peak of R wave, which is usually measured in aVL and V5 or V6 leads.

R-peak time for right ventricle is measured from leads V1 or V2, where upper range of normal is 35 ms. R wave peak time for left ventricle is measured from lead V5 or V6 and 45 ms is the upper range of normal. R wave peak time is considered to be prolonged if it's more than 45 ms.

=== J-point ===
The point where the QRS complex meets the ST segment is the J-point. The J-point is easy to identify when the ST segment is horizontal and forms a sharp angle with the last part of the QRS complex. However, when the ST segment is sloped or the QRS complex is wide, the two features do not form a sharp angle and the location of the J-point is less clear. There is no consensus on the precise location of the J-point in these circumstances. Two possible definitions are:

- The "first point of inflection of the upstroke of the S wave"
- The point at which the ECG trace becomes more horizontal than vertical

== Terminology ==
Various QRS complexes with nomenclature.

Not every QRS complex contains a Q wave, an R wave, and an S wave. By convention, any combination of these waves can be referred to as a QRS complex. However, correct interpretation of difficult ECGs requires exact labeling of the various waves. Some authors use lowercase and capital letters, depending on the relative size of each wave. For example, an Rs complex would be positively deflected, while an rS complex would be negatively deflected. If both complexes were labeled RS, it would be impossible to appreciate this distinction without viewing the actual ECG.

=== Monomorphic or polymorphic ===
Monomorphic refers to all QRS waves in a single lead being similar in shape. Polymorphic means that the QRS change from complex to complex. These terms are used in the description of ventricular tachycardia.

== Algorithms ==
A common algorithm used for QRS complex detection is the Pan-Tompkins algorithm (or method); another is based on the Hilbert transform. Numerous other algorithms have been proposed and investigated. In recent research, heart beat detection methods based on visibility graphs have been introduced, enabling fast and sample-precise R-peak annotation even in noisy ECG.

== See also ==
- Electrophysiology
- Electrocardiography
- PR interval
- QT interval
- ST segment
