= Right bundle branch block =

Heart block in the right ventricle

- An illustration of a right bundle branch block located in intraventricular septum
- ECG characteristics of a typical RBBB showing wide QRS complexes with a terminal R wave in lead V1 and a prolonged S wave in lead V6.
- Specialty: Cardiology
- Types: complete right bundle branch block (CRBBB) incomplete right bundle branch block (IRBBB)

A right bundle branch block (RBBB) is a heart block in the right bundle branch of the electrical conduction system.

During a right bundle branch block, the right ventricle is not directly activated by impulses traveling through the right bundle branch. However, the left bundle branch still normally activates the left ventricle. These impulses can then travel through the myocardium of the left ventricle to the right ventricle and depolarize the right ventricle this way. As conduction through the myocardium is slower than conduction through the bundle of His-Purkinje fibres, the QRS complex is seen to be widened. The QRS complex often shows an extra deflection that reflects the rapid depolarisation of the left ventricle, followed by the slower depolarisation of the right ventricle.

== Incomplete right bundle branch block ==
An incomplete right bundle branch block (IRBBB) is a conduction abnormality in the right bundle branch block. While a complete RBBB has a QRS duration of 120 ms or more, an incomplete RBBB has a wave duration between 100 and 120 ms. It has a relatively high prevalence, a study conducted on young Swiss military conscripts with a mean age of 19 years found a prevalence of 13.5%. It affects patients of all ages, more commonly males and athletes, however it is not always a benign finding. Therefore, if abnormalities are detected on the physical exam, further testing should be done to exclude heart disease.

There is no consensus in the literature regarding criteria for diagnosis. However, according to the American Heart Association/American College of Cardiology Foundation/Heart Rhythm Society (AHA/ACCF/HRS) it is defined by the following finding in adults:

1. QRS wave duration between 100 and 120 ms.
2. rsr, rsR, or rSR in leads V1 or V2.
3. S wave of longer duration than R wave or greater than 40 ms in leads I and V6.
4. Normal R wave peak time in both V5 and V6, but greater than 50 ms in V1.

The first three criteria are needed for diagnosis. The fourth is needed when a pure dominant R waver is present on V1.

== Causes ==
Common causes include normal variation, changes in bundle branch structure - such as mechanical stretching, chest trauma, right ventricular hypertrophy or strain, congenital heart disease such as atrial septal defect, and ischemic heart disease. In addition, a right bundle branch block may also result from Brugada syndrome, Chagas disease, pulmonary embolism, rheumatic heart disease, myocarditis, cardiomyopathy, or hypertension.

Causes for incomplete right bundle branch block (IRBBB) often involve exercise-induced right ventricular remodeling, increased right ventricular (RV) free wall thickness, especially in athletes due to prolonged endurance exercise.

== Diagnosis ==
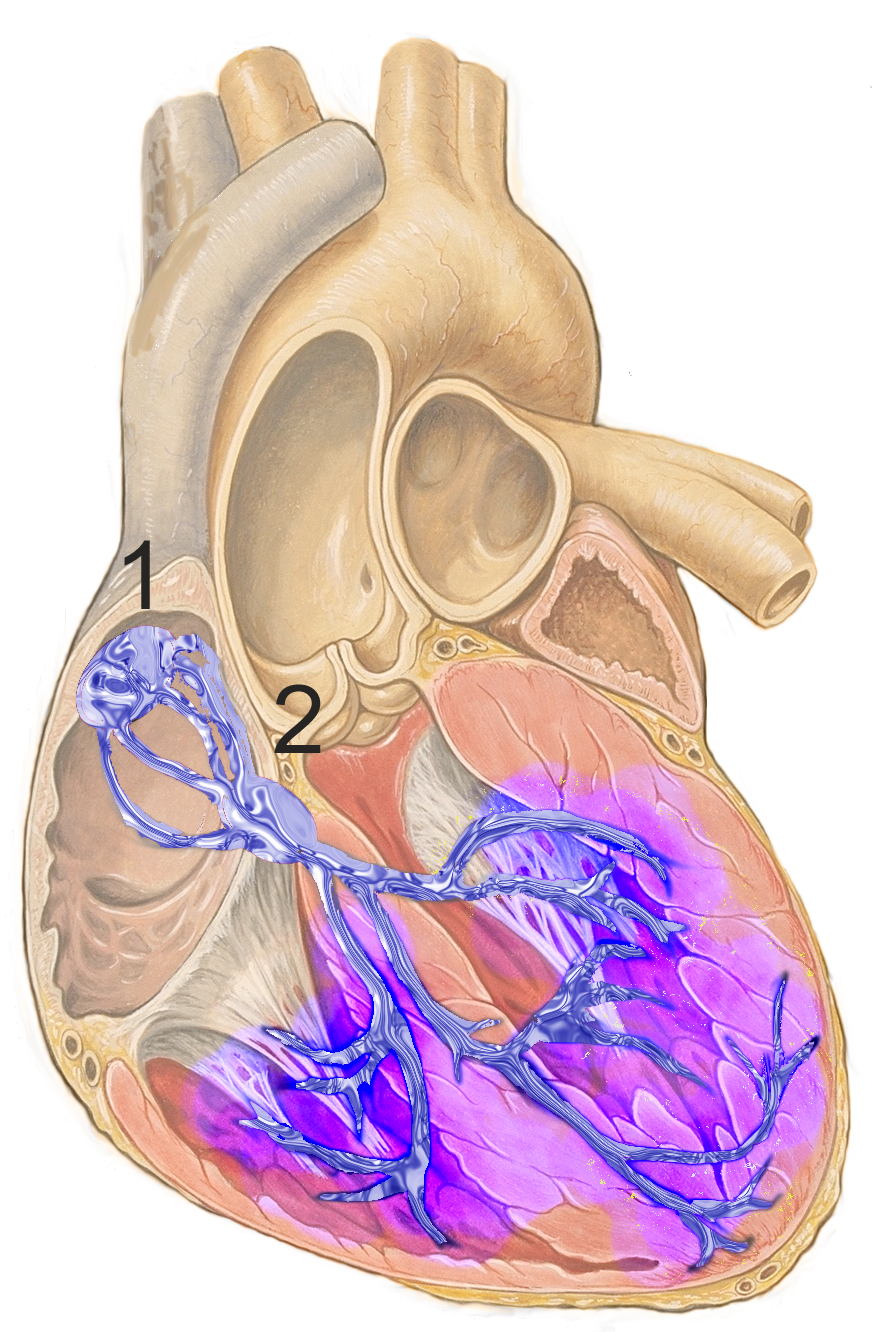
Normal electrical conduction system of the heart (Schematic). All myocardial segments are excited almost simultaneously (purple staining).
1. Sinoatrial node
2. Atrioventricular node

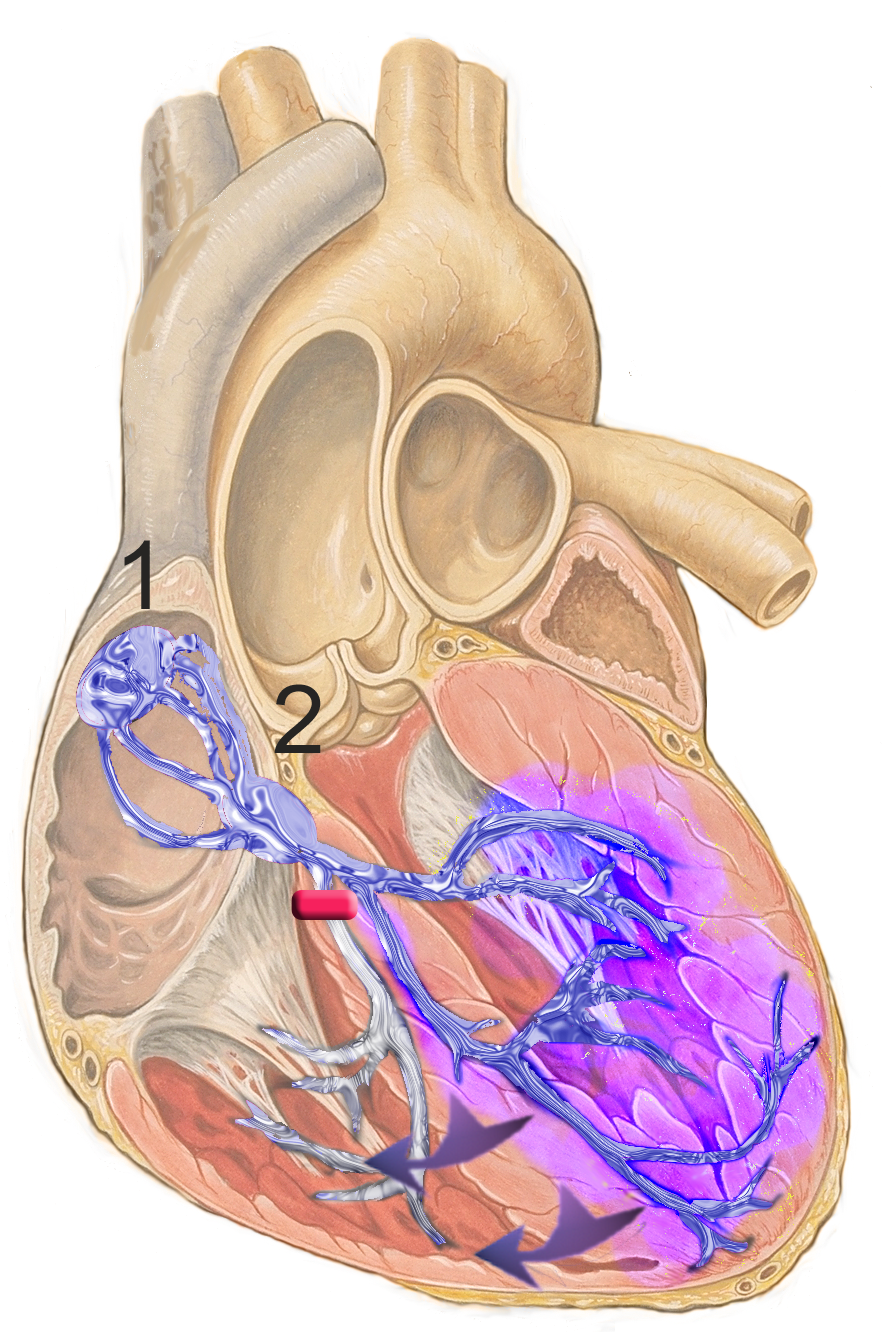
Conduction in RBBB (Schematic): With a blockage in the right bundle branch (red), the left ventricle is excited in time (purple), while the excitation of the right ventricle takes a detour via the left bundle branch (blue arrows).

The criteria to diagnose a right bundle branch block on the electrocardiogram:

- The heart rhythm must originate above the ventricles (i.e., sinoatrial node, atria or atrioventricular node) to activate the conduction system at the correct point.
- The QRS duration must be more than 100 ms (incomplete block) or more than 120 ms (complete block).
- There should be a terminal R wave in lead V_{1} (often called "R prime," and denoted by R, rR', rsR', rSR', or qR).
- There must be a prolonged S wave in leads I and V_{6} (sometimes referred to as a "slurred" S wave).

The T wave should be deflected opposite the terminal deflection of the QRS complex. This is known as appropriate T wave discordance with bundle branch block. A concordant T wave may suggest ischemia or myocardial infarction.

== Treatment ==
The underlying condition may be treated by medications to control hypertension or diabetes, if they are the primary underlying cause. If coronary arteries are blocked, an invasive coronary angioplasty may relieve the impending RBBB.

== Epidemiology ==
Prevalence of RBBB increases with age due to changes in the heart's conduction system. It's estimated up to 11.3% of the population by the age of 80 have RBBB.

== Gallery ==
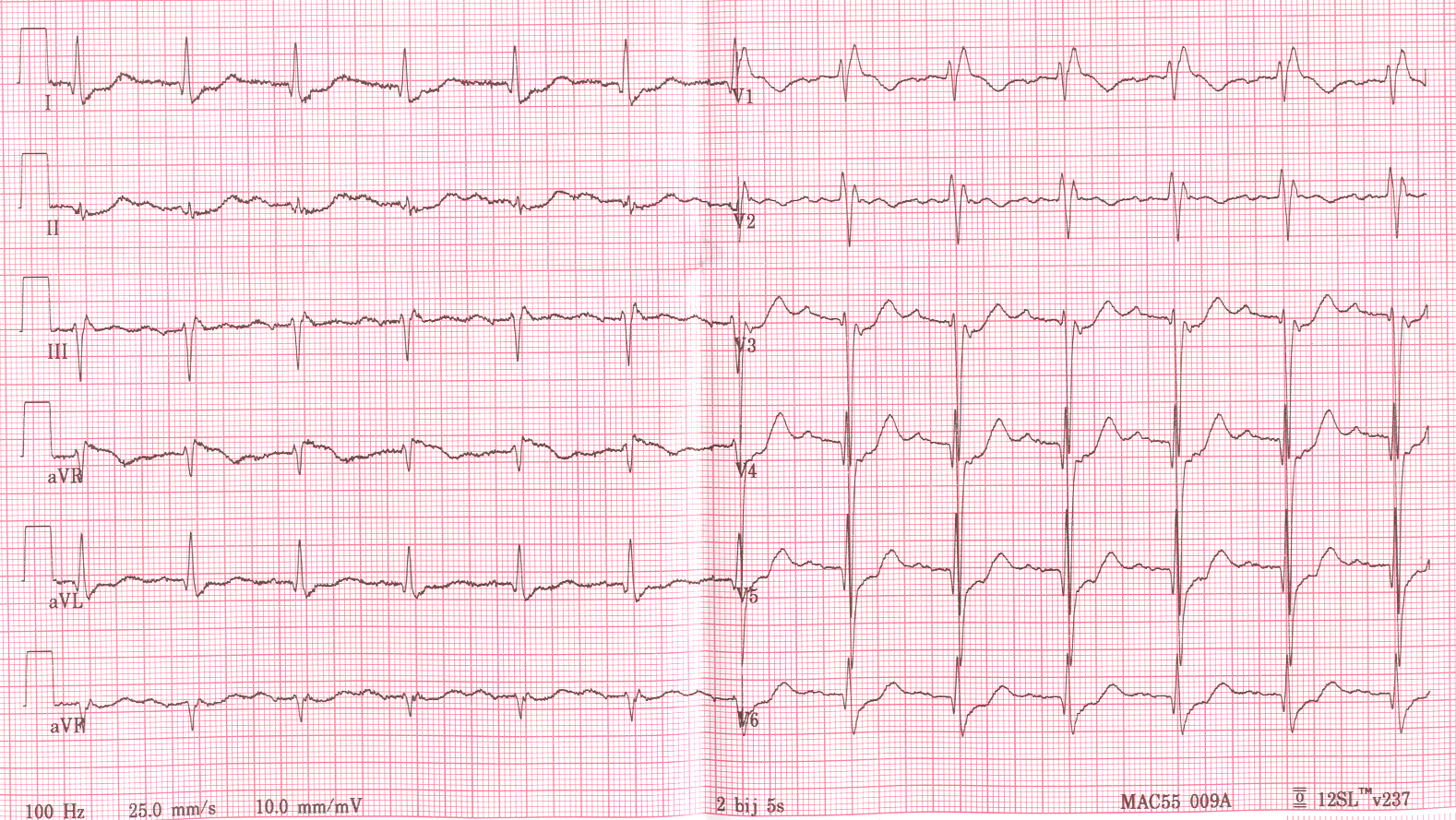
RBBB with associated first degree AV block

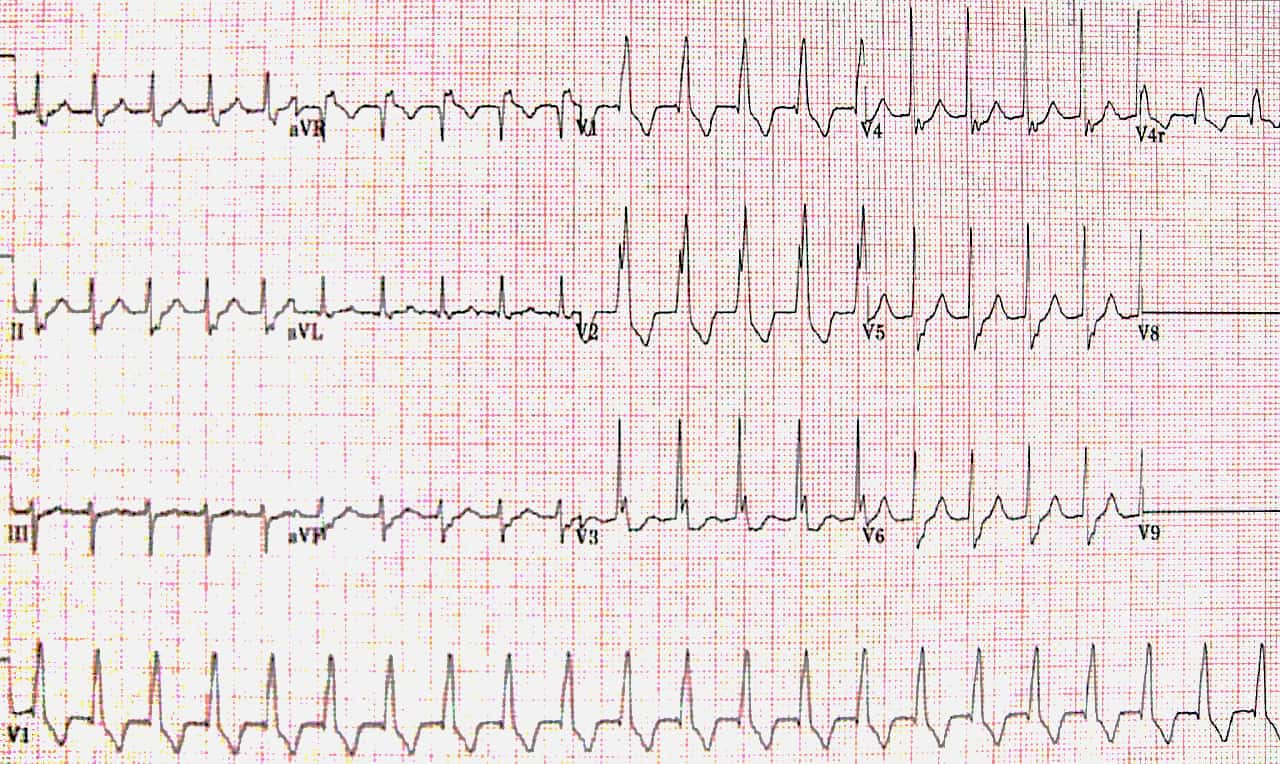
RBBB with associated tachycardia

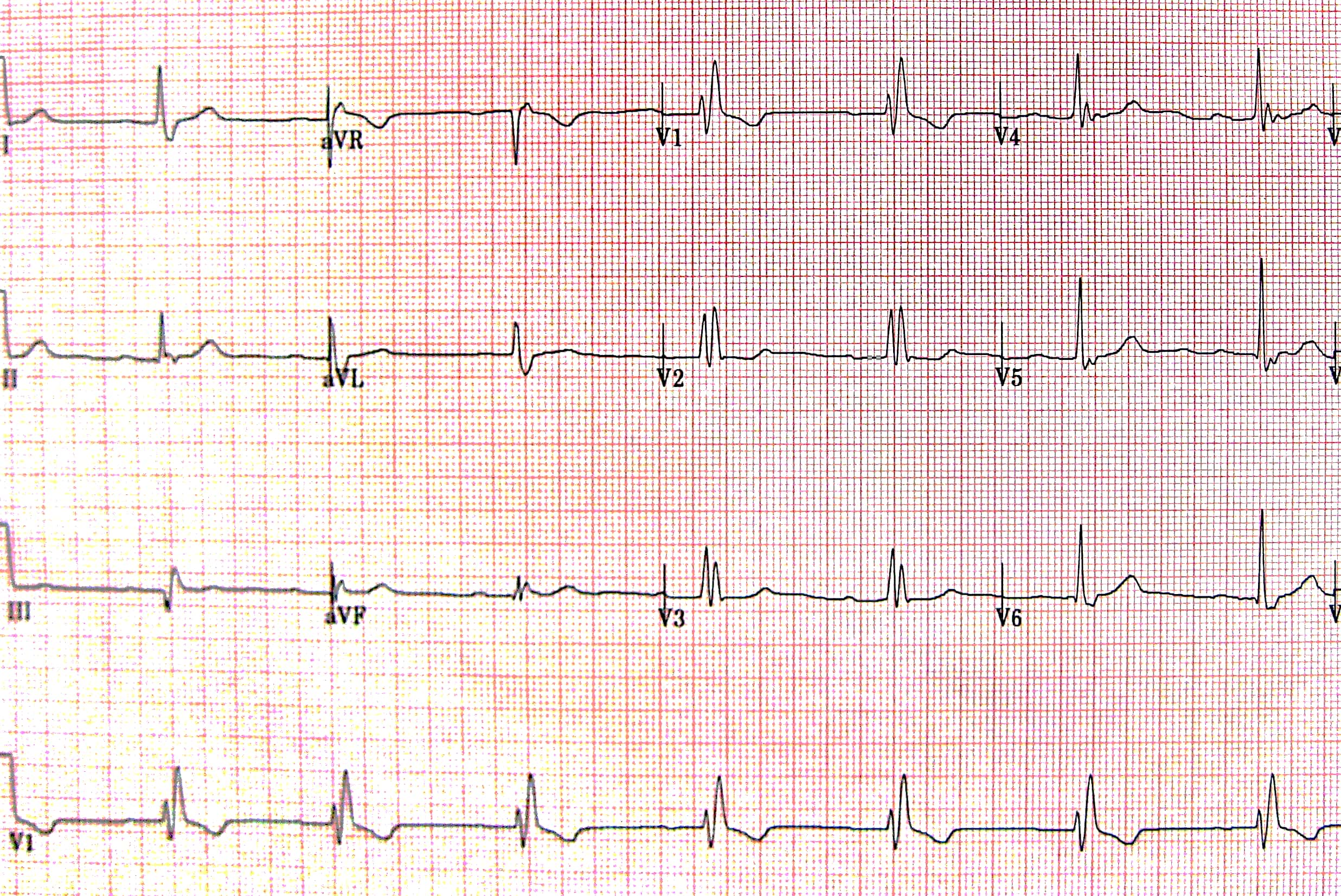
RBBB

== See also ==
- Bundle branch block
- Intraventricular block
- Left bundle branch block
