= Einthoven =

Einthoven is a German surname. Notable people with the surname include:

- Louis Einthoven (1896–1979), Dutch lawyer
- Willem Einthoven (1860–1927), Dutch physiologist
