= Left bundle branch block =

- ECG characteristics of a typical LBBB showing wide QRS complexes with abnormal morphology in leads V1 and V6.
- Specialty: Cardiology, Emergency Medicine

Left bundle branch block (LBBB) is a conduction abnormality in the heart that can be seen on an electrocardiogram (ECG). In this condition, activation of the left ventricle of the heart is delayed, which causes the left ventricle to contract later than the right ventricle.

== Causes ==
Among the causes of LBBB are:

- Aortic stenosis
- Dilated cardiomyopathy
- Acute myocardial infarction
- Extensive coronary artery disease
- Primary disease of the cardiac electrical conduction system
- Long-standing hypertension leading to aortic root dilatation and subsequent aortic regurgitation
- Lyme disease

== Mechanisms ==
Slow or absent conduction through the left bundle branch means that it takes longer than normal for the left ventricle to fully depolarise. This can be due to a damaged bundle branch that is completely unable to conduct, but may represent intact conduction that is slower than normal. LBBB may be fixed, present at all times, but may be intermittent for example occurring only during rapid heart rates. This may be due to the bundle having a longer refractory period than usual.

== Diagnosis ==
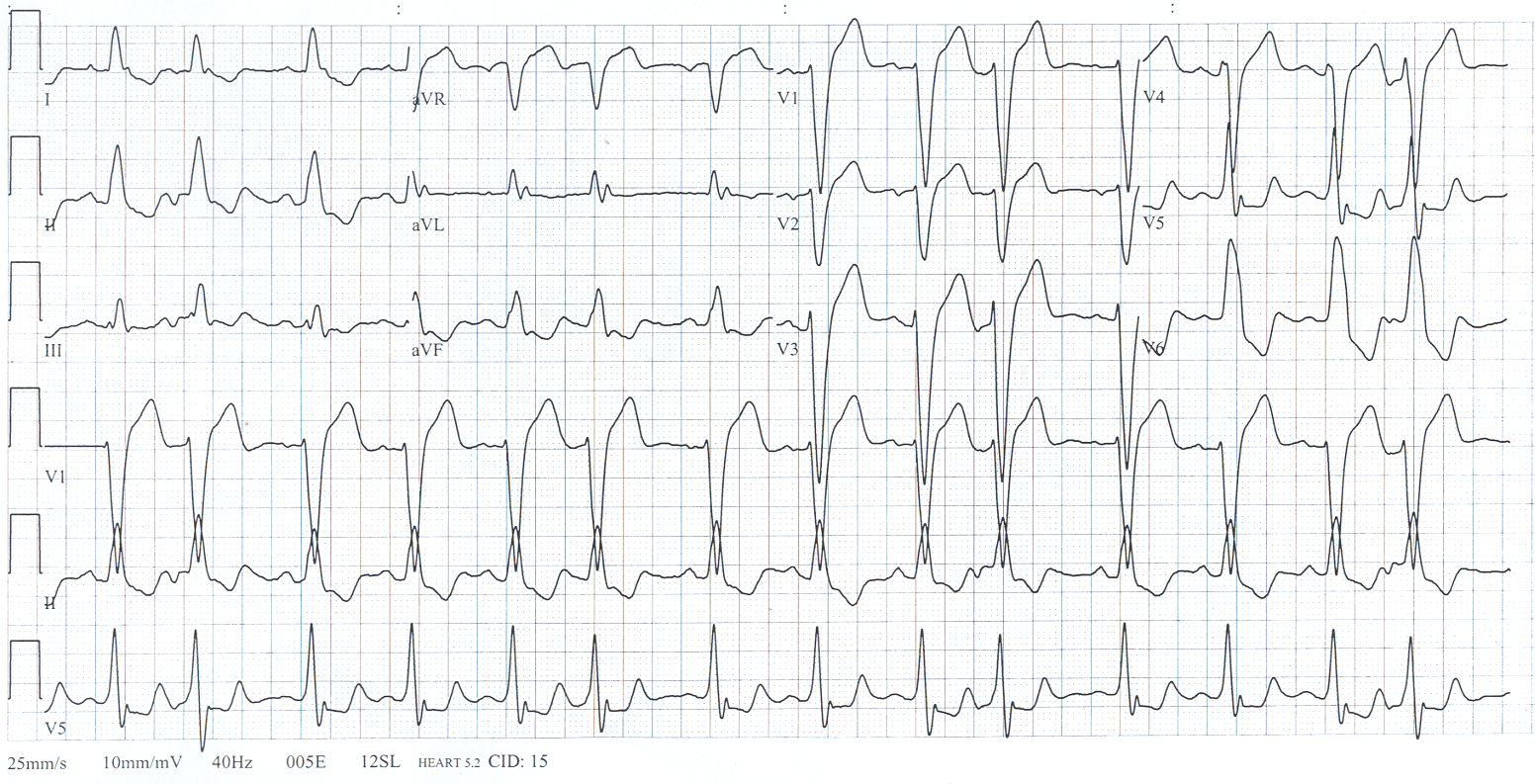
Electrocardiogram showing left bundle branch block and irregular rhythm due to supraventricular extrasystoles.

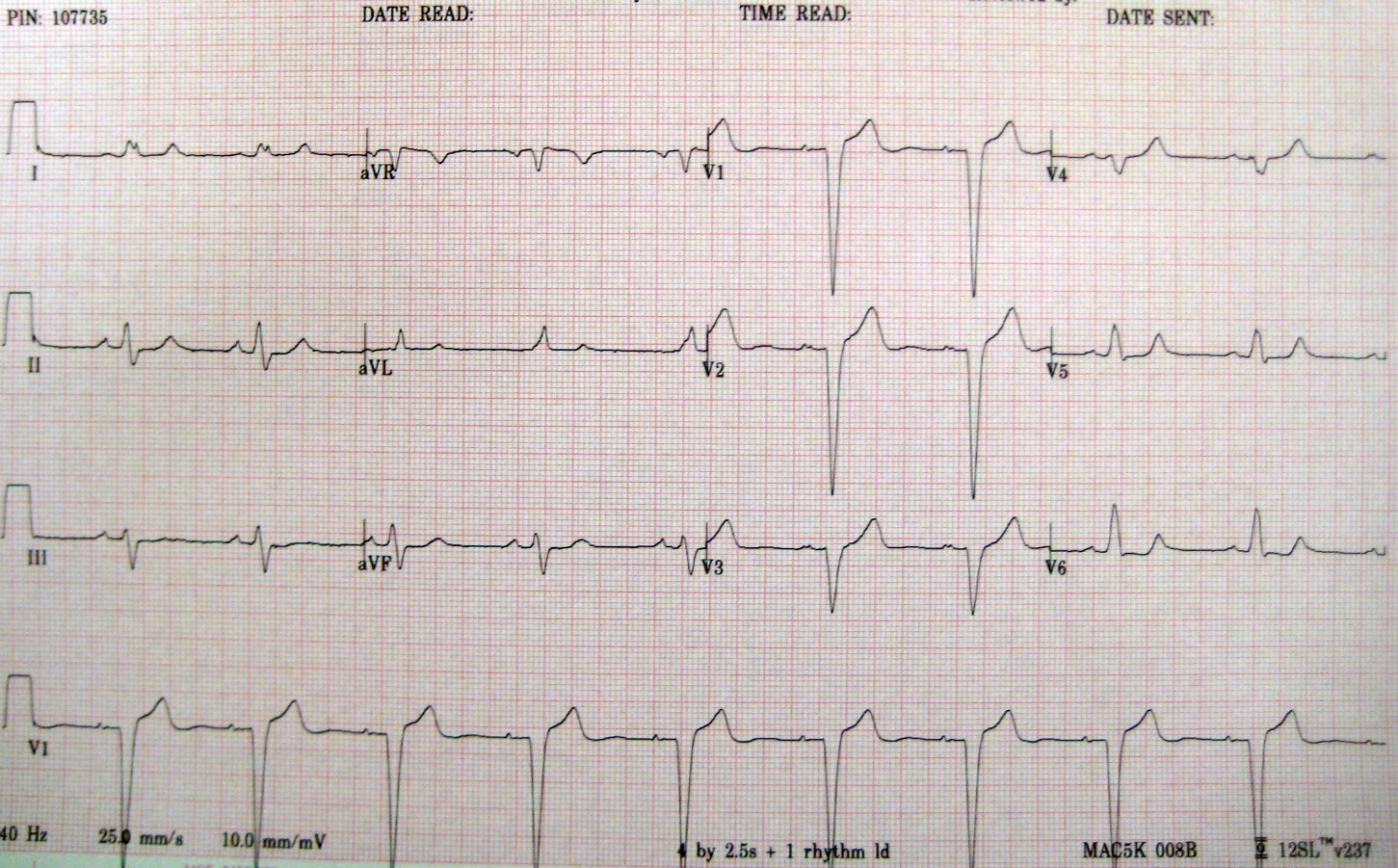
A left bundle branch block

LBBB is diagnosed on a 12-lead ECG. In adults, it is seen as wide QRS complexes lasting ≥120ms with characteristic QRS shapes in the precordial leads, although narrower complexes are seen in children. In lead V_{1}, the QRS complex is often entirely negative (QS morphology), although a small initial R wave may be seen (rS morphology). In the lateral leads (I, aVL, V_{5}-V_{6}) the QRS complexes are usually predominantly positive with a slow upstroke last >60ms to the R-wave peak. Notching may be seen in these leads but this is not universal. The small Q-waves that are usually seen in the lateral leads are absent in LBBB. T-waves usually point in the opposite direction to the terminal portion of the preceding QRS - positive QRS complexes have negative T-waves while negative QRS complexes have positive T-waves. The ST segments typically slur into the T-wave and often appear elevated in leads with negative QRS complexes. The axis may be normal but may be deviated to the left or right.

There are also partial blocks of the left bundle branch: "left anterior fascicular block" (LAFB) and a "left posterior fascicular block" (LPFB). This refers to the block after the bifurcation of the left bundle branch.

=== Diagnostic consequences ===
The presence of LBBB results in that electrocardiography (ECG) cannot be used to diagnose left ventricular hypertrophy or Q wave infarction, because LBBB in itself results in a widened QRS complex and changes in the ST segment consistent with ischemia or injury.

=== BARCELONA Criteria ===
Given the difficulty diagnosing an acute myocardial infarction (AMI) in patients with pre-existing LBBB, a multicenter retrospective cohort study was done to help improve diagnosis of AMI in this patient population. Sgarbossa criteria and its Modified Criteria have historically been used to determine AMI in patients with LBB, but the clinical utility has a high specificity (90%) with a low sensitivity (36%).

Two new approaches to the ECG were elaborated to improve the diagnostic sensitivity of ECG in patients with LBBB and suspected AMI. First, since any ST deviation concordant with the QRS should be regarded as abnormal, it was hypothesized that not only concordant ST elevation but also concordant ST depression might be a sign of AMI. The Sgarbossa rule of concordant ST depression in leads V1 to V3 was then extended to include any other lead to, in theory, cover the electrocardiographic projection of acute ischemia in different myocardial regions. Second, the presence of an appreciable (≥1 mm or 0.1 mV) discordant ST deviation in low‐voltage QRS complexes was considered as a positive criterion for AMI. This criterion was included because in the absence of ischemia, these complexes usually show isoelectric ST‐segment potentials.

The results of the study resulted in the development of the BARCELONA algorithm. Under these criteria, an ECG is positive for an AMI in the presence of LBBB if any of the following criteria are present:

1. ST deviation ≥1 mm (0.1 mV) concordant with QRS polarity in any ECG lead, thus including either:
  1. ST depression ≥1 mm (0.1 mV) concordant with QRS polarity, in any ECG lead.
  2. ST elevation ≥1 mm (0.1 mV) concordant with QRS polarity, in any ECG lead (Sgarbossa score 5).
2. ST deviation ≥1 mm (0.1 mV) discordant with QRS polarity, in any lead with max (R|S) voltage ≤6 mm (0.6 mV).

The BARCELONA algorithm attained the highest sensitivity (95%), significantly higher (P<0.01) than Sgarbossa and Modified Sgarbossa rules, as well as the highest negative predictive value (97%), while maintaining 89% specificity. The global performance of the BARCELONA algorithm was significantly better than previous algorithms: It achieved the highest efficiency (91%) and the highest area under the ROC curve (0.92), which was significantly higher (P<0.01) than the ones obtained by the Sgarbossa and Modified Sgarbossa rules. The BARCELONA algorithm also allowed a significant improvement in the ability to predict the occurrence of an AMI, as shown by Integrated Discrimination Improvement and Net Reclassification Improvement indexes (both indexes showed P<0.01 comparing BARCELONA algorithm with Sgarbossa and Modified Sgarbossa rules).

== Treatment ==
- Patients with LBBB require complete cardiac evaluation, and those with LBBB and syncope or near-syncope may require a pacemaker.
- Some patients with LBBB, a markedly prolonged QRS (usually > 150 ms), and systolic heart failure may benefit from a biventricular pacemaker, which allows for better synchrony of heart contractions.

== See also ==
- Bundle branch block
- Right bundle branch block
- Sgarbossa's criteria
