= Left posterior fascicular block =

- Other names: Left posterior hemiblock
- Specialty: Cardiology

A left posterior fascicular block (LPFB), also known as left posterior hemiblock (LPH), is a condition where the left posterior fascicle, which travels to the inferior and posterior portion of the left ventricle, does not conduct the electrical impulses from the atrioventricular node. The wave-front instead moves more quickly through the left anterior fascicle and right bundle branch, leading to a right axis deviation seen on the ECG.

== Definition ==
The American Heart Association has defined a LPFB as:

- Frontal plane axis between 90° and 180° in adults
- rS pattern in leads I and aVL
- qR pattern in leads III and aVF
- QRS duration less than 120 ms

The broad nature of the posterior bundle as well as its dual blood supply makes isolated LPFB rare.

== See also ==
- Left anterior fascicular block
- Left bundle branch block
