= Left anterior fascicular block =

- Other names: "LAFB," "left anterior hemiblock," "LAHB"
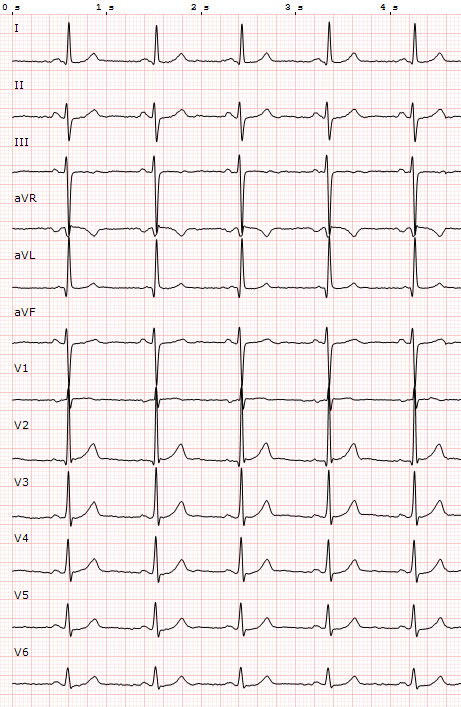
- ECG displaying high lateral Q waves and left axis deviation, characteristic of LAFB.
- Specialty: Cardiology
- Causes: Ischemic heart disease; progressive cardiac conduction disease
- Diagnostic method: 12-lead ECG
- Differential diagnosis: Left ventricular hypertrophy (LVH)

Left anterior fascicular block (LAFB) is an abnormal condition of the left ventricle of the heart, related to, but distinguished from, left bundle branch block (LBBB).

It occurs as a result of a conduction block in the left anterior fascicle, one of the offshoots of the left bundle branch. It manifests on the ECG as left axis deviation (LAD) and QRS prolongation.

== Mechanism ==
Normal activation of the left ventricle (LV) proceeds down the left bundle branch, which consists of three fascicles: the left anterior fascicle, left posterior fascicle, and septal fascicle. The posterior fascicle supplies the posterior and inferoposterior walls of the LV, the anterior fascicle supplies the upper and anterior parts of the LV and the septal fascicle supplies the septal wall with innervation.

In LAFB, the cardiac impulse initially propagates through the left posterior fascicle, resulting in delayed activation of the anterior and superior parts of the LV. Although there is a delay or block in activation of the left anterior fascicle, left to right septal activation, as well as inferior activation of the LV, is preserved. (On the ECG, septal Q waves in I and aVL and predominantly negative QRS complex in leads II, III, and aVF are preserved.) The delayed and unopposed activation of the remainder of the LV then results in a shift in the QRS axis leftward and superiorly, causing marked left axis deviation. This delayed activation also results in a widening of the QRS complex, although not to the extent of a complete LBBB.

LAFB is more common than left posterior fascicular block (LPFB), primarily because the left posterior fascicle is less aerobically, mechanically, and electrically vulnerable to damage, as it is vascularized with both the left anterior descending artery and the right coronary artery, has a relatively small action potential duration, and sits safely in the left ventricular outflow tract. Consequently, LPFB typically appears only with diffuse multi-vessel disease.

== Diagnosis ==
- Pathological LAD (usually between –45° and –60°).
- qR pattern (small q, tall R) in the lateral limb leads (I and aVL).
- rS pattern (small r, deep S) in the inferior leads II, III, and aVF.
- Delayed intrinsicoid deflection in lead aVL (> 0.045 seconds).

=== Effect on infarction and left ventricular hypertrophy diagnosis ===
LAFB may be a cause of poor R wave progression across the precordium causing a pseudoinfarction pattern mimicking an anteroseptal infarction. It also complicates the electrocardiographic diagnosis of LVH because both LVH and LAFB often result in a large R wave in lead aVL. In this case, the presence a left ventricular strain pattern favors the diagnosis of LVH.

Diagnosing LAFB requires additional care given evidence of prior inferior wall myocardial infarction (IMI). IMI can also cause extreme LAD, but will manifest with Q-waves in the inferior leads II, III, and aVF. By contrast, QRS complexes in the inferior leads should begin with r-waves in LAFB. Vectorcardiography may be used to differentiate LAFB and IMI or to confirm their coexistence.

== Clinical significance ==
- It is commonly seen in acute myocardial infarction.
  - It is the most common type of intraventricular conduction defect seen in acute anterior myocardial infarction, and the left anterior descending artery is usually the culprit vessel.
  - It can be seen with acute inferior wall myocardial infarction.
- It is also associated with hypertensive heart disease, aortic valvular disease, cardiomyopathies, and degenerative fibrotic disease of the cardiac skeleton.

== See also ==
- Bundle branch block
