= Left ventricular hypertrophy =

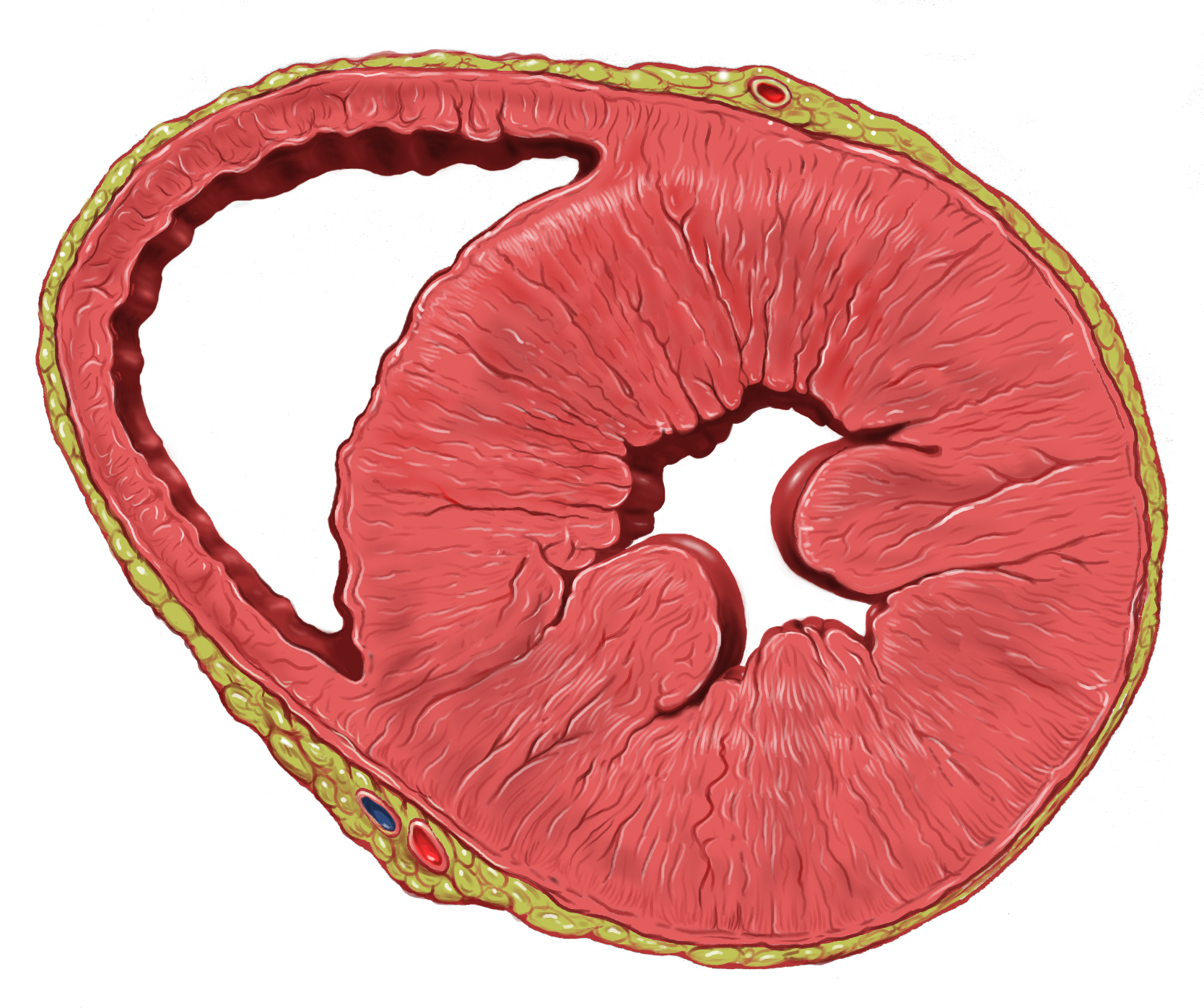
- A heart with left ventricular hypertrophy in short-axis view
- Specialty: Cardiology
- Complications: Hypertrophic cardiomyopathy, Heart failure
- Diagnostic method: Echocardiography, cardiovascular MRI
- Differential diagnosis: Athletic heart syndrome

Left ventricular hypertrophy (LVH) is thickening of the heart muscle of the left ventricle of the heart, that is, left-sided ventricular hypertrophy and resulting increased left ventricular mass.

== Causes ==
While ventricular hypertrophy occurs naturally as a reaction to aerobic exercise and strength training, it is most frequently referred to as a pathological reaction to cardiovascular disease, or high blood pressure. It is one aspect of ventricular remodeling.

While LVH itself is not a disease, it is usually a marker for disease involving the heart. Disease processes that can cause LVH include any disease that increases the afterload that the heart has to contract against, and some primary diseases of the muscle of the heart. Causes of increased afterload that can cause LVH include aortic stenosis, aortic insufficiency and hypertension. Primary disease of the muscle of the heart that cause LVH are known as hypertrophic cardiomyopathies, which can lead into heart failure.

Long-standing mitral insufficiency also leads to LVH as a compensatory mechanism.

LV mass increases with ageing.

Associated genes include OGN (osteoglycin).

== Diagnosis ==
The commonly used method to diagnose LVH is echocardiography, with which the thickness of the muscle of the heart can be measured. The electrocardiogram (ECG) often shows signs of increased voltage from the heart in individuals with LVH, so this is often used as a screening test to determine who should undergo further testing.

=== Echocardiography ===
Left ventricular hypertrophy grading by posterior wall thickness
Mild	12 to 13 mm
Moderate	>13 to 17 mm
Severe	>17 mm

Two dimensional echocardiography can produce images of the left ventricle. The thickness of the left ventricle as visualized on echocardiography correlates with its actual mass. Left ventricular mass can be further estimated based on geometric assumptions of ventricular shape using the measured wall thickness and internal diameter. Average thickness of the left ventricle, with numbers given as 95% prediction interval for the short axis images at the mid-cavity level are:

- Women: 4 – 8 mm
- Men: 5 – 9 mm

=== CT & MRI ===
CT and MRI-based measurement can be used to measure the left ventricle in three dimensions and calculate left ventricular mass directly. MRI based measurement is considered the "gold standard" for left ventricular mass, though is usually not readily available for common practice. In older individuals, age related remodeling of the left ventricle's geometry can lead to a discordancy between CT and echocardiographic based measurements of left ventricular mass.

=== ECG criteria ===
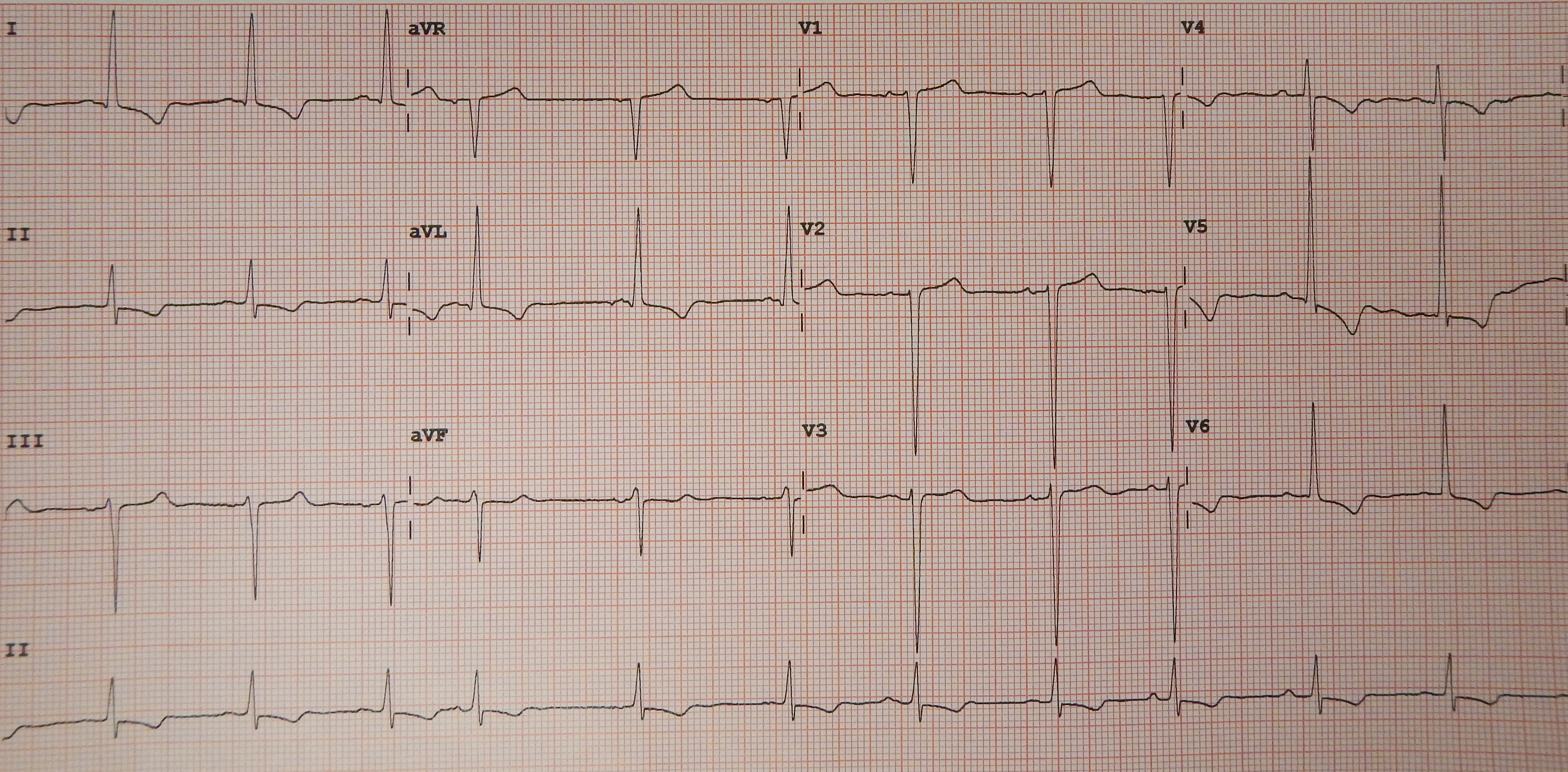
Left ventricular hypertrophy with secondary repolarization abnormalities as seen on ECG

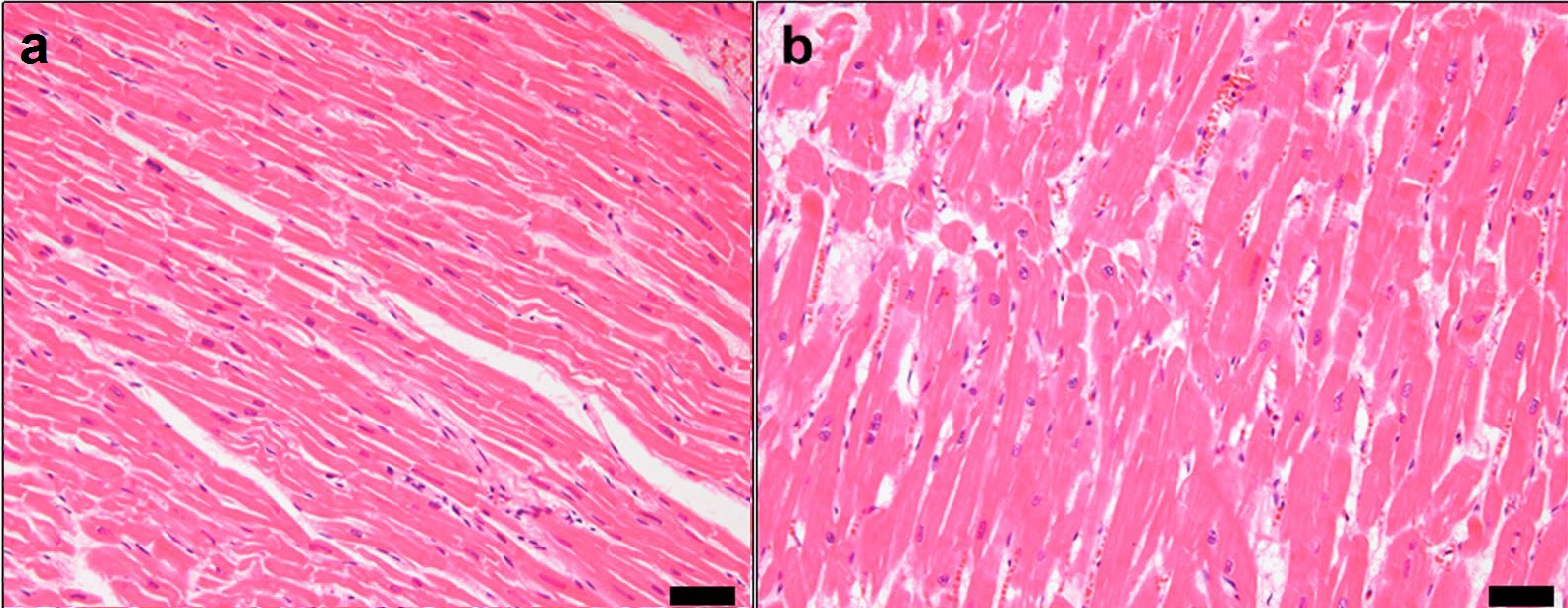
Histopathology of (a) normal myocardium and (b) myocardial hypertrophy. Scale bar indicates 50 μm.

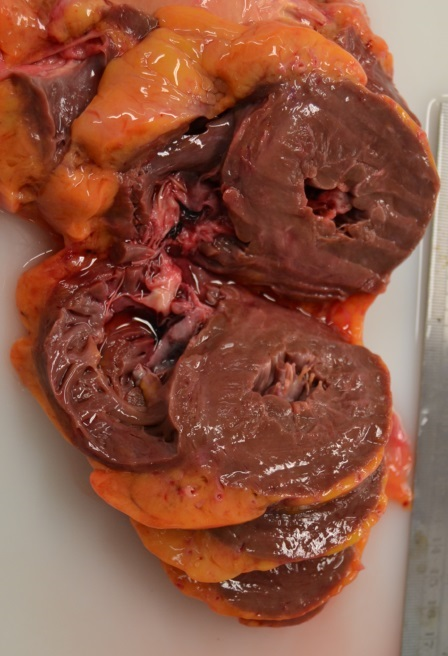
Gross pathology of left ventricular hypertrophy. Left ventricle is at right in image, serially sectioned from apex to near base.

There are several sets of criteria used to diagnose LVH via electrocardiography. None of them are perfect, though by using multiple criteria sets, the sensitivity and specificity are increased.

The Sokolow-Lyon index:

- S in V_{1} + R in V_{5} or V_{6} (whichever is larger) ≥ 35 mm (≥ 7 large squares)
- R in aVL ≥ 11 mm

The Cornell voltage criteria for the ECG diagnosis of LVH involve measurement of the sum of the R wave in lead aVL and the S wave in lead V_{3}. The Cornell criteria for LVH are:

- S in V_{3} + R in aVL > 28 mm (men)
- S in V_{3} + R in aVL > 20 mm (women)

The Romhilt-Estes point score system ("diagnostic" >5 points; "probable" 4 points):

ECG Criteria
Points
Voltage Criteria (any of):
1. R or S in limb leads ≥20 mm
2. S in V_{1} or V_{2} ≥30 mm
3. R in V_{5} or V_{6} ≥30 mm
3
ST-T Abnormalities:
- ST-T vector opposite to QRS without digitalis
- ST-T vector opposite to QRS with digitalis

3
1

Negative terminal P mode in V_{1} 1 mm in depth and 0.04 sec in duration (indicates left atrial enlargement)
3
Left axis deviation (QRS of −30° or more)
2
QRS duration ≥0.09 sec
1
Delayed intrinsicoid deflection in V_{5} or V_{6} (>0.05 sec)
1

Other voltage-based criteria for LVH include:

- Lead I: R wave > 14 mm
- Lead aVR: S wave > 15 mm
- Lead aVL: R wave > 12 mm
- Lead aVF: R wave > 21 mm
- Lead V_{5}: R wave > 26 mm
- Lead V_{6}: R wave > 20 mm

Diagnostic accuracy of electrocardiography in left ventricular hypertrophy can be enhanced with artificial intelligence analysis.

== Treatment ==
Treatment is typically focused on resolving the cause of the LVH with the enlargement not permanent in all cases. In some cases the growth can regress with the reduction of blood pressure.

LVH may be a factor in determining treatment or diagnosis for other conditions, for example, LVH is used in the staging and risk stratification of Non-ischemic cardiomyopathies such as Fabry's Disease. Patients with LVH may have to participate in more complicated and precise diagnostic procedures, such as echocardiography or cardiac MRI.

== See also ==
- Cardiomegaly
- Primary hyperparathyroidism
- Ventricular hypertrophy
