= Wilson Greatbatch =

American engineer and inventor (1919–2011)

- Born: 6 September 1919; Buffalo, New York, U.S.
- Died: 27 September 2011 (aged 92)
- Education: Cornell University; University at Buffalo
- Occupation: Engineer

Wilson Greatbatch (September 6, 1919 – September 27, 2011) was an American engineer and pioneering inventor. He held more than 325 patents and was a member of the National Inventors Hall of Fame and a recipient of the Lemelson–MIT Prize and the National Medal of Technology and Innovation (1990).

== Early years ==
Greatbatch was born in Buffalo, New York and attended public grade school at West Seneca High School. He entered military service and served during World War II, becoming an aviation chief radioman before receiving an honorable discharge in 1945. He attended Cornell University as part of the GI Bill, graduating with a B.E.E. in electrical engineering in 1950. He received a master's degree from the University of Buffalo in 1957.

== The Chardack–Greatbatch pacemaker ==
The Chardack–Greatbatch pacemaker used Mallory mercuric oxide-zinc cells (mercury battery) for its energy source, driving a two transistor, transformer coupled blocking oscillator circuit, all encapsulated in epoxy resin, then coupled to electrodes placed into the myocardium of the patient's heart. This patented innovation led to the Medtronic company of Minneapolis commencing manufacture and further development of artificial cardiac pacemakers.

== The Greatbatch lithium-iodide battery cell ==
In 1968, Catalyst Research Corporation of Baltimore, Maryland developed and patented a lithium battery cell U.S. patent 4,049,890. The cell used two elements at near ends of the electrochemical scale, causing a high voltage of 2.8V and an energy density near the physical maximum. Unfortunately, it had an internal impedance which limited its current load to under 0.1 mA and was thus considered useless.

Greatbatch sought to introduce this invention into the pacemaker industry, which could readily use a high impedance battery. The early work was conducted in a rented area of the former Wurlitzer Organ Factory in North Tonawanda, New York. Ralph Mead is understood to have headed the early electrochemical development.

Greatbatch introduced the developed WG1 cell to pacemaker developers in 1971, and was met with limited enthusiasm. On July 9, 1974, Manuel A. Villafaña and Anthony Adducci founders of Cardiac Pacemakers Inc.(Guidant) in St. Paul, Minnesota, manufactured the world's first pacemaker with a lithium anode and a lithium-iodide electrolyte solid-state battery. The lithium-iodide cell manufactured by Greatbatch is now the standard cell for pacemakers, having the energy density, low self-discharge, small size and reliability needed.

In the cell as developed for cardiac pacemaker application, the anode is lithium and the cathode a proprietary composition of iodine and poly-2-vinylpyridine, neither of which is electrically conductive. However, after processing by mixing and heating to ~150 °C for 72 hours the components react with each other to form an electrically conductive viscous liquid which, while still molten, is poured into the cell where it cools to form a solid. When the liquid contacts the lithium anode it creates a monomolecular layer of semiconducting crystalline lithium iodide. As the cell is discharged by the current load of the pacemaker, the reaction between the lithium anode and iodine cathode forms a growing barrier of lithium iodide, This is resistive, and causes the terminal voltage of the cell to decrease approximately as an inverse function of the volume of the barrier. Pacemaker designers use this characteristic to permit detection of incipient 'end of life' of the pacemaker's lithium cell.

== Philanthropy ==
Greatbatch donated funds to Houghton College in New York to create a graduate program in music. The Houghton College Center for the Arts (CFA) was designed with his donations to include a concert hall, art gallery, multi-floor gathering space, and various choir and instrumental practice rooms. It was subsequently named the Greatbatch School of Music after him. Houghton College assisted Greatbatch in his research, when he was unable to generate support, providing him with lab space and research assistance.

In 2009, Wilson and Eleanor Greatbatch donated approximately $10 million to create a modern glass reception and interpretive pavilion, called the Eleanor and Wilson Greatbatch Pavilion, separate from the Darwin D. Martin House Complex. It was designed by Toshiko Mori, chair of the department of architecture at Harvard's Graduate School of Design.

Greatbatch served as an elder at Clarence Presbyterian Church, where he also sang in the church choir and taught Sunday school.

== Death ==
Wilson Greatbatch died at the age of 92 on September 27, 2011.
