= Dudeney =

Dudeney is a surname. Notable people with the surname include:

- Alice Dudeney (1866–1945), English writer, wife of Henry
- Henry Dudeney (1857–1930), English writer and mathematician
  - Dudeney number
- Leonard Dudeney (1875–1956), English newspaper editor and journalist

== See also ==
- Dewdney (surname)
