= Electrical pacing =

Electrical pacing may refer to:

== Medicine ==
- Transcutaneous pacing
- Transvenous pacing
- Epicardial pacing
