= Guidant =

Medical manufacturing company

- Logo as of 2003
- Type: Subsidiary
- Industry: Medical devices
- Predecessor: Cardiac Pacemakers, Inc.
- Founded: 1994
- Defunct: 2006
- Fate: Merged into Boston Scientific and Abbott Laboratories
- Headquarters: Indianapolis, Indiana, United States
- Number of locations: 8
- Products: Artificial cardiac pacemakers, implantable cardioverter-defibrillators, stents, other cardiovascular medical devices
- Website: guidant.com at the Wayback Machine (archived 2007-08-23)

Guidant Corporation was an American medical equipment manufacturer. It designed artificial cardiac pacemakers, implantable cardioverter-defibrillators, stents, and other cardiovascular medical products. It was headquartered in Indianapolis, Indiana.

== History ==
In February 1972, Cardiac Pacemakers, Inc. (CPI) of St. Paul, Minnesota was formed. CPI was a highly successful start up venture, increasing sales from zero in 1972 to over $47 million and highly profitable when it was acquired by Eli Lilly in 1978 for $127 million. In 1977 Eli Lilly & Co. buys IVAC of San Diego (a manufacturer of medical pumps and other hospital equipment) for $60.5 million. In 1980, Eli Lilly & Co. acquires Physio-Control of Redmond, WA. and Advanced Cardiovascular Systems of Santa Clara, CA [1984] (balloon dilatation catheters and guidewires) along with Devices for Vascular Intervention(DVI) of Redwood City, CA [1988] (athetectomy catheter). These companies formed the core product/therapy areas of the Medical Devices Division of Eli Lilly and Company.

In 1994, Lilly had a change in senior management and Randy Tobias, the new president & CEO, decided that Lilly would focus on its pharma and other related businesses. The Medical Devices Division was spun off and went public in late 1994 under the name of Guidant Corporation (NYSE and PCX: GDT). The new company focused on cardiac rhythm management (pacemakers and implantable defibrillators) and cardiac and vascular intervention products via coronary and peripheral stents, guidewires and balloon dilatation catheters. Less invasive heart surgery was another small business unit of Guidant.

In February 1999 the business acquired Sulzer Medicas electrophysiology business for $810 million cash and in November of the same year, acquired CardioThoracic Systems, Inc.

In July 2002 the company acquired Cook Group Incorporated, and months later in December, Guidant acquired Cardiac Intelligence Corporation.

In April 2003 the business acquired SyneCor, LLC, developer of a fully bioabsorbable vascular stent. Months later, in June 2003 Guidant acquired X Technologies, Inc. for $60 million.

In January 2004, the company acquired AFx inc., a pioneer in the field of microwave surgical cardiac ablation.

=== Acquisition offer by Johnson & Johnson ===
Johnson & Johnson announced that it was acquiring Guidant on December 15, 2004, for $76 a share, at a cost of $25.4 billion. The deal was approved by Guidant stockholders on April 27, 2005. On May 25, Guidant reported 26 cases of implantable defibrillator failure, including one death. The same day, the New York Times published an article accusing Guidant of waiting years before notifying physicians about the problems. On June 17, Guidant issued a safety advisory on seven models of defibrillator, followed a week later by advising doctors to discontinue use of four models. The scope of the problems steadily increased, and on July 18, 2005, Guidant issued a warning for nine different models of pacemakers from 1997 to 2000. The next day, Johnson & Johnson warned that the acquisition may be delayed due to these issues. On September 22, Guidant issued safety advisories and recalls for 170,000 of their pacemakers, 56% of their total pacemakers. On October 18, Johnson & Johnson gave an announcement that they were exploring alternatives to the acquisition, followed by a November 2 warning that they might pull out of the deal due to the regulatory issues and legal liabilities. On November 7, 2005, Guidant sued Johnson & Johnson to force them to complete the deal. On November 15, the two companies announced a renegotiated purchase price of $63 a share, or $21.5 billion, a 15% price reduction.

=== Acquisition offer by Boston Scientific ===
On December 5, 2005, Boston Scientific made a surprise unsolicited $24.6 billion bid to acquire Guidant, offering $72 per share of Guidant, $36 in cash and a fixed number of Boston Scientific shares valued at $36 a share. Guidant's stock price rose 10% on the news. The offer was not actually finalized until after due diligence had been completed on January 8, 2006.

=== Counter-offers ===
On January 11, 2006, Johnson & Johnson presented a counteroffer of $23.2 billion, still less than their original 2004 bid, which the Guidant board accepted. The next day, Boston Scientific increased their bid to $25 billion, followed the next day by Johnson & Johnson increasing their bid to $24.2 billion. It was not until January 17 that Boston Scientific produced a new offer of $27.2 billion ($80 per share), with the help of Abbott Laboratories. Abbott agreed to purchase $1.4 billion of Boston Scientific stock and pay $4.1 billion for Guidant's vascular intervention business upon completion of the merger. Without Abbott's financial assistance, it would have been unlikely that Boston Scientific could have produced the counteroffer.

On January 25, 2006, after Johnson & Johnson refused to raise their bid higher than $24.2 billion, Guidant declared Boston Scientific's offer "clearly superior" and accepted their bid. Guidant paid a $705 million termination fee to Johnson & Johnson.

On April 21, 2006, the deal with Boston Scientific was complete. This deal included Abbott Labs buying the vascular intervention business of Guidant for approximately $4.5 billion. Fortune magazine characterized the deal as the second worst deal ever, stating that the company paid too much for Guidant. On July 27, 2006, Boston Scientific posted a loss of $4.26 billion for the quarter.

== Locations ==
- Indianapolis, Indiana (world headquarters)
- Redmond, Washington (Cardiac Rhythm Management)
- Santa Clara, California (Vascular Intervention, Endovascular Solutions, Cardiac Surgery)
- Arden Hills, Minnesota (Cardiac Rhythm Management)
- Temecula, California (Vascular Intervention)
- Clonmel, Ireland (Manufacturing)
- Dorado, Puerto Rico (Manufacturing)
- Galway, Ireland (Manufacturing)
