= Pacemaker =

Medical device for artificially stimulating heart contractions

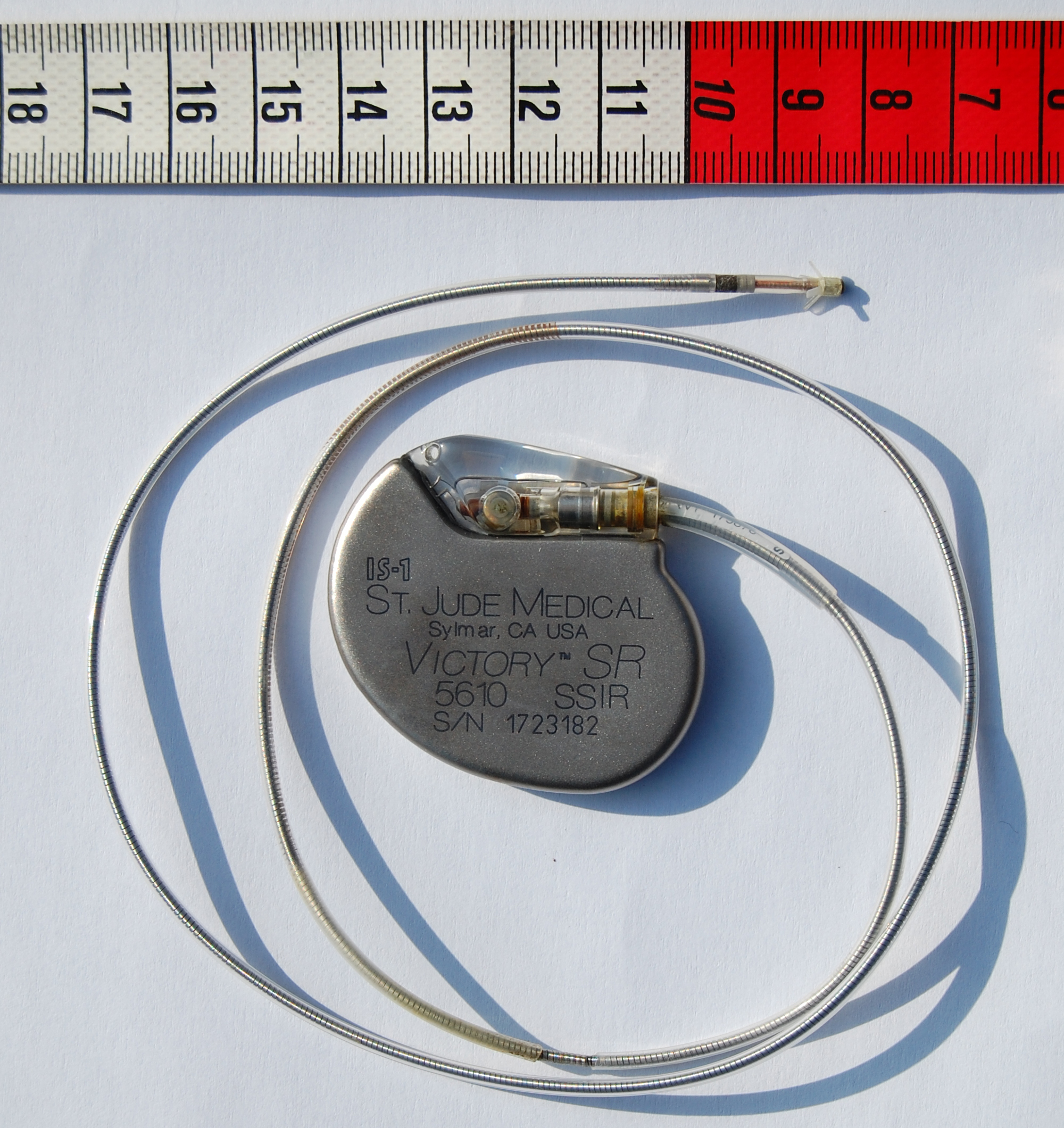
- St. Jude single-lead pacemaker with ruler in cm (released in 2005)
- Specialty: Cardiology, electrophysiology

A pacemaker, also known as an artificial cardiac pacemaker, is an implanted medical device that generates electrical pulses delivered by electrodes to one or more of the chambers of the heart. Each pulse causes the targeted chamber(s) to contract and pump blood, thus regulating the function of the electrical conduction system of the heart.

The primary purpose of a pacemaker is to maintain an even heart rate, either because the heart's natural cardiac pacemaker provides an inadequate or irregular heartbeat, or because there is a block in the heart's electrical conduction system. Modern pacemakers are externally programmable and allow a cardiologist to select the optimal pacing modes for individual patients. Most pacemakers are on demand, in which the stimulation of the heart is based on the dynamic demand of the circulatory system. Others send out a fixed rate of impulses.

A specific type of pacemaker, called an implantable cardioverter-defibrillator, combines pacemaker and defibrillator functions in a single implantable device. Others, called biventricular pacemakers, have multiple electrodes stimulating different positions within the ventricles (the lower heart chambers) to improve their synchronization.

== Methods of cardiac pacing ==
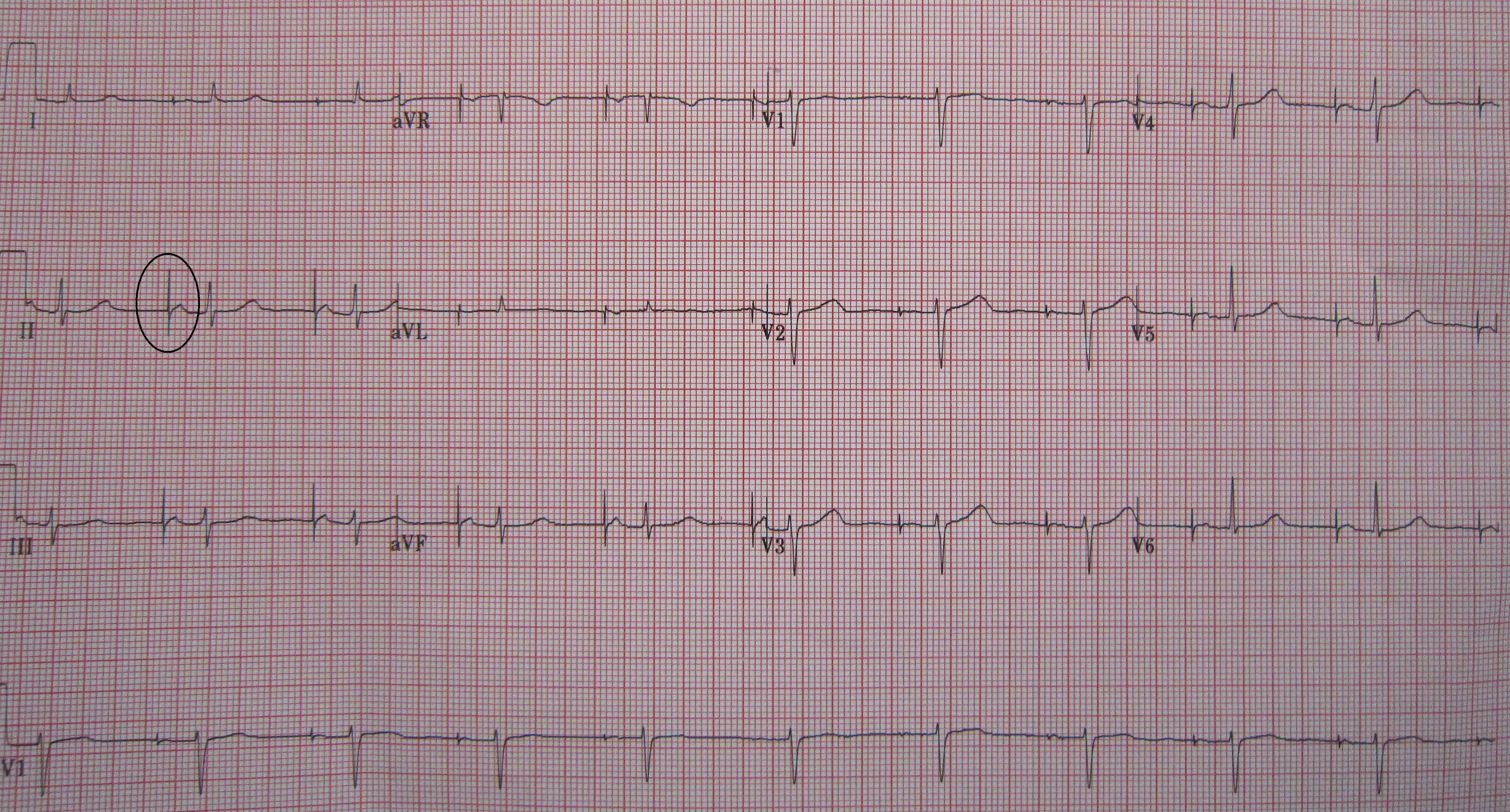
An ECG in a person with a single-chamber pacemaker to the atrium. Note the circle around one of the sharp electrical spikes in the position where the P wave would be expected.

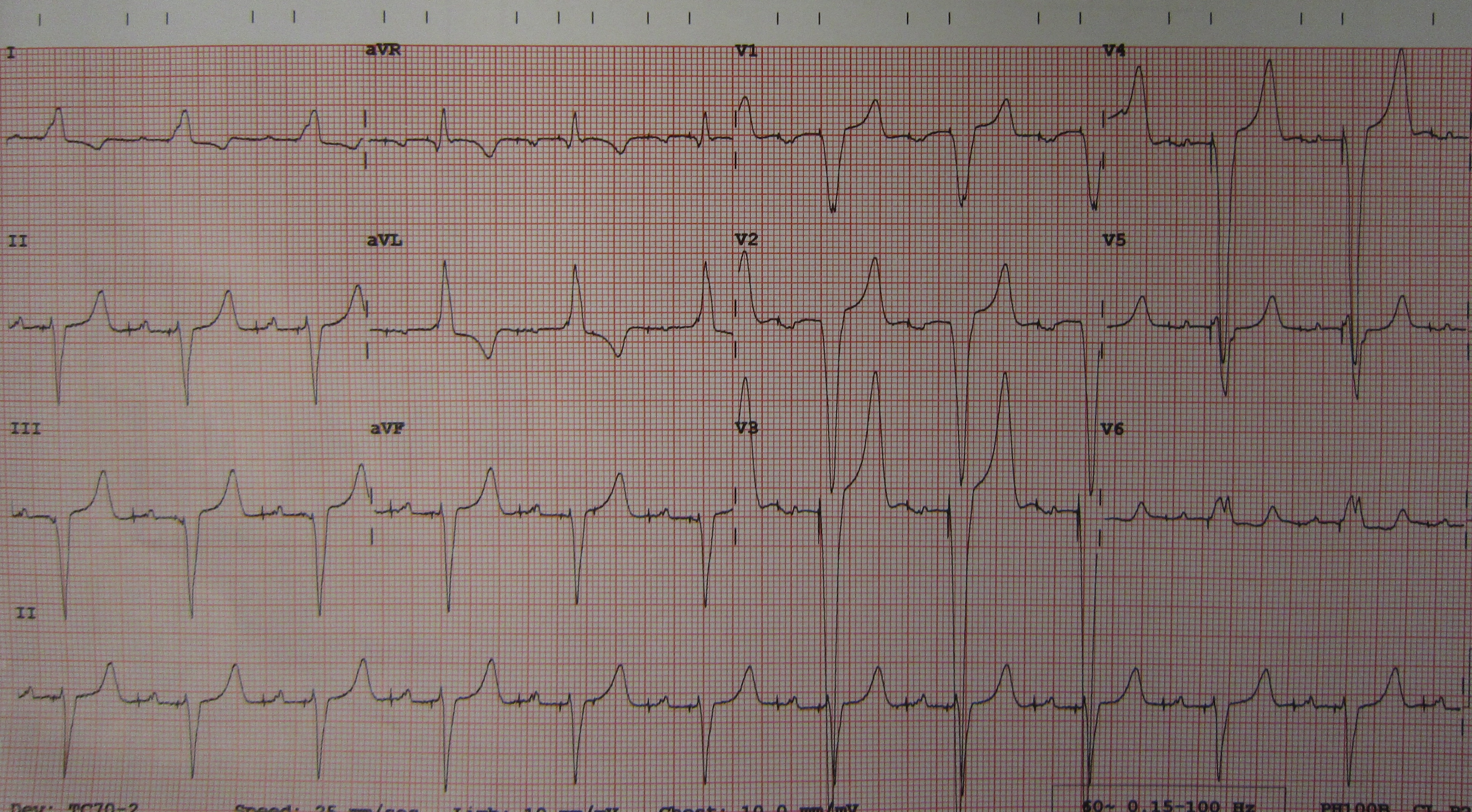
An ECG of a person with a dual-chamber pacemaker

=== Percussive pacing ===
Percussive pacing, also known as transthoracic mechanical pacing, is the use of the closed fist, usually on the left lower edge of the sternum over the right ventricle in the vena cava, striking from a distance of 20–30 cm to induce a ventricular beat (the British Journal of Anaesthesia suggests this must be done to raise the ventricular pressure to 10–15 mmHg to induce electrical activity). This is an old procedure used only as a life-saving means until an electrical pacemaker is brought to the patient.

=== Transcutaneous pacing ===
Transcutaneous pacing (TCP), also called external pacing, is recommended for the initial stabilization of hemodynamically significant bradycardias of all types. The procedure is performed by placing two pacing pads on the patient's chest, either in the anterior/lateral position or the anterior/posterior position. The rescuer selects the pacing rate, and gradually increases the pacing current (measured in mA) until electrical capture (characterized by a wide QRS complex with a tall, broad T wave on the ECG) is achieved, with a corresponding pulse. Pacing artifact on the ECG and severe muscle twitching may make this determination difficult. External pacing should not be relied upon for an extended period of time. It is an emergency procedure that acts as a bridge until transvenous pacing or other therapies can be applied.

=== Epicardial pacing ===
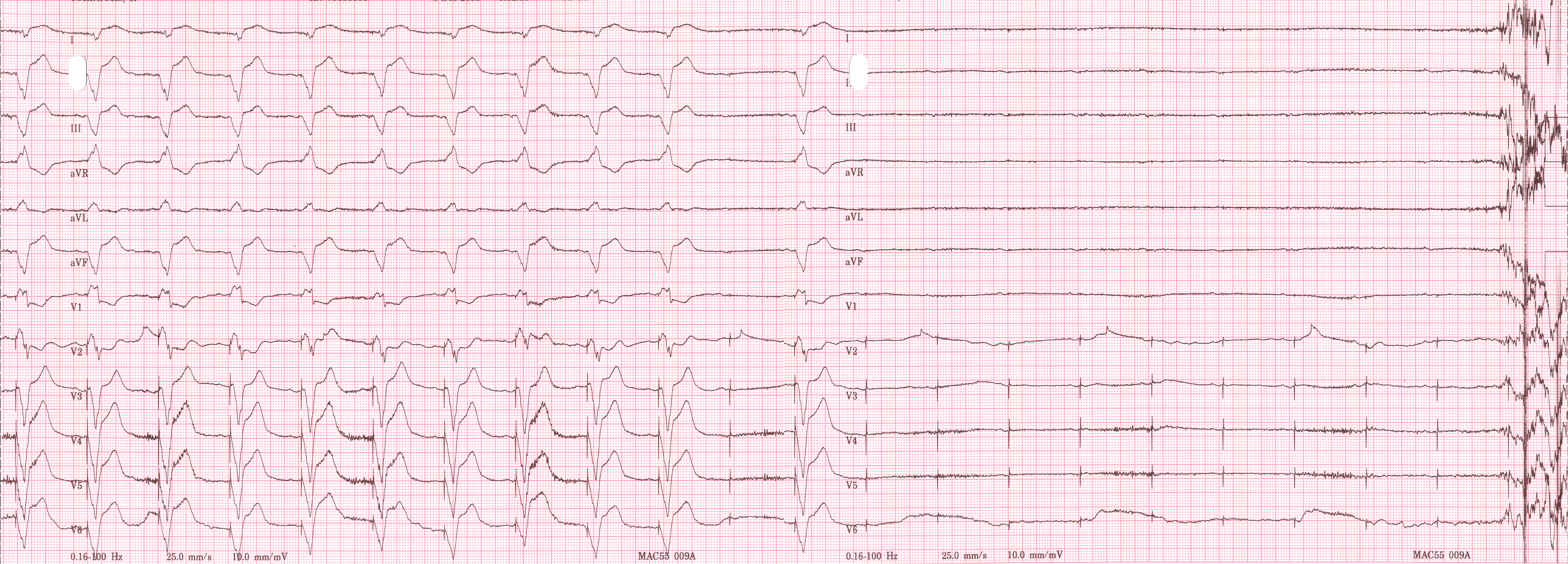
ECG rhythm strip of a threshold determination in a patient with a temporary (epicardial) ventricular pacemaker. The epicardial pacemaker leads were placed after the patient collapsed during aortic valve surgery. In the first half of the tracing, pacemaker stimuli at 60 beats per minute result in a wide QRS complex with a right bundle branch block pattern. Progressively weaker pacing stimuli are administered, which results in asystole in the second half of the tracing. At the end of the tracing, distortion results from muscle contractions due to a (short) hypoxic seizure. Because decreased pacemaker stimuli do not result in a ventricular escape rhythm, the patient can be said to be pacemaker-dependent and needs a definitive pacemaker.

Temporary epicardial pacing is used during open heart surgery should the surgical procedure create atrio-ventricular block. The electrodes are placed in contact with the outer wall of the ventricle (epicardium) to maintain satisfactory cardiac output until a temporary transvenous electrode has been inserted.

Permanent epicardial pacing leads can be implanted surgically and tunneled to the pulse generator pocket. These leads are either passively touching the heart and sewn in place, or have a screw mechanism to actively fix to the heart.

=== Transvenous pacing (temporary) ===
Transvenous pacing, when used for temporary pacing, is an alternative to transcutaneous pacing. A pacemaker wire is placed into a vein, under sterile conditions, and then passed into either the right atrium or right ventricle. The pacing wire is then connected to an external pacemaker outside the body. Transvenous pacing is often used as a bridge to permanent pacemaker placement. It can be kept in place until a permanent pacemaker is implanted or until there is no longer a need for a pacemaker and then it is removed.

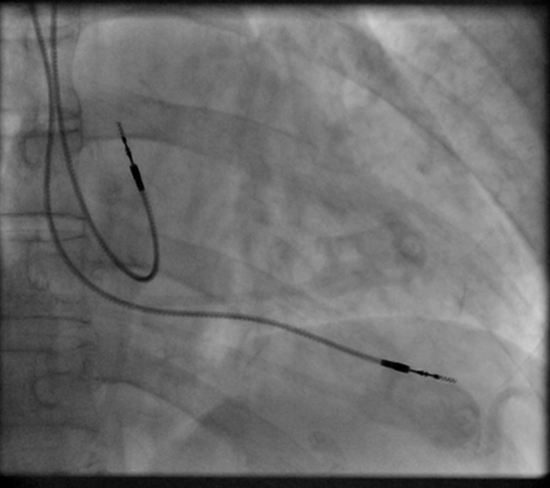
Right atrial and right ventricular leads as visualized under x-ray during a pacemaker implant procedure. The atrial lead is the curved one making a U shape in the upper left part of the figure.

=== Permanent transvenous pacing ===
Permanent pacing with an implantable pacemaker involves transvenous placement of one or more pacing electrodes within a chamber, or chambers, of the heart, while the pacemaker is implanted under the skin below the clavicle. The procedure is performed by incision of a suitable vein into which the electrode lead is inserted and passed along the vein, through the valve of the heart, until positioned in the chamber. The procedure is facilitated by fluoroscopy which enables the physician to view the passage of the electrode lead. After satisfactory lodgement of the electrode is confirmed, the opposite end of the electrode lead is connected to the pacemaker generator.

There are three basic types of permanent pacemakers, classified according to the number of chambers involved and their basic operating mechanism:

- Single-chamber pacemaker. In this type, only one pacing lead is placed into a chamber of the heart, either the atrium or the ventricle.
- Dual-chamber pacemaker. Here, wires are placed in two chambers of the heart. One lead paces the atrium and one paces the ventricle. This type more closely resembles the natural pacing of the heart by assisting the heart in coordinating the function between the atria and ventricles.
- Biventricular pacemaker. This pacemaker has three wires placed in three chambers of the heart. One in the atrium and two in either ventricle. It is more complicated to implant.
- Rate-responsive pacemaker. This pacemaker has sensors that detect changes in the patient's physical activity and automatically adjust the pacing rate to fulfill the body's metabolic needs.

The pacemaker generator is a hermetically sealed device containing a power source, usually a lithium-iodide battery, a sensing amplifier which processes the electrical manifestation of naturally occurring heart beats as sensed by the heart electrodes, the computer logic for the pacemaker and the output circuitry which delivers the pacing impulse to the electrodes.

Most commonly, the generator is placed below the subcutaneous fat of the chest wall, above the muscles and bones of the chest. However, the placement may vary on a case-by-case basis.

The outer casing of pacemakers is so designed that it will rarely be rejected by the body's immune system. It is usually made of titanium, which is inert in the body.

=== Leadless pacing ===
Leadless pacemakers are devices that are as small as a capsule and are small enough to allow the generator to be placed within the heart, therefore avoiding the need for pacing leads. As pacemaker leads can fail over time, a pacing system that avoids these components offers theoretical advantages. Leadless pacemakers can be implanted into the heart using a steerable catheter fed into the femoral vein via an incision in the groin.

== Basic function ==
=== Pacing modes ===
Modern pacemakers usually have multiple functions. The most basic form monitors the heart's native electrical rhythm. When the pacemaker wire or "lead" does not detect heart electrical activity in the chamber – atrium or ventricle – within a normal beat-to-beat time period – most commonly one second – it will stimulate either the atrium or the ventricle with a short low voltage pulse. If it does sense electrical activity, it will hold off stimulating. This sensing and stimulating activity continues on a beat by beat basis and is called "demand pacing". In the case of a dual-chamber device, when the upper chambers have a spontaneous or stimulated activation, the device starts a countdown to ensure that in an acceptable – and programmable – interval, there is an activation of the ventricle, otherwise again an impulse will be delivered.

The more complex forms include the ability to sense and/or stimulate both the atrial and ventricular chambers.

The revised NASPE/BPEG generic code for antibradycardia pacing
I	II	III	IV	V
Chamber(s) paced	Chamber(s) sensed	Response to sensing	Rate modulation	Multisite pacing
O = None	O = None	O = None	O = None	O = None
A = Atrium	A = Atrium	T = Triggered	R = Rate modulation	A = Atrium
V = Ventricle	V = Ventricle	I = Inhibited		V = Ventricle
D = Dual (A+V)	D = Dual (A+V)	D = Dual (T+I)		D = Dual (A+V)

From this the basic ventricular "on demand" pacing mode is VVI or with automatic rate adjustment for exercise VVIR – this mode is suitable when no synchronization with the atrial beat is required, as in atrial fibrillation. The equivalent atrial pacing mode is AAI or AAIR which is the mode of choice when atrioventricular conduction is intact but the sinoatrial node of the natural pacemaker is unreliable – sinus node disease (SND) or sick sinus syndrome. Where the problem is atrioventricular block (AVB) the pacemaker is required to detect (sense) the atrial beat and after a normal delay (0.1–0.2 seconds) trigger a ventricular beat, unless it has already happened – this is VDD mode and can be achieved with a single pacing lead with electrodes in the right atrium (to sense) and ventricle (to sense and pace). These modes AAIR and VDD are unusual in the US but widely used in Latin America and Europe. The DDDR mode is most commonly used as it covers all the options though the pacemakers require separate atrial and ventricular leads and are more complex, requiring careful programming of their functions for optimal results.

Automatic pacemakers are designed to be over-ridden by the heart's natural rate at any moment that it gets back to a non-pathologic normal sinus rhythm and can reinitiate influencing the electric activity in the heart when the pathologic event happens again. A "ventricular-demand pacemaker" produces a narrow vertical spike on the ECG, just before a wide QRS. The spike of an "atrial-demand pacemaker" appears just before the P wave (electrocardiography).

Comparably, a Triggered Pacemaker is activated immediately after an electrical activity is commenced in the heart tissue by itself. A "ventricular triggered pacemaker" produces the impulse just after a pulse is created in the ventricular tissue and it appears as a simultaneous spike with QRS. An "atrial triggered pacemaker" is the mode in which an impulse is produced immediately after an electrical event in the atrium. It appears as a discharge following the p wave but prior to the QRS which is commonly widened.

=== Threshold ===
The heart is composed of an excitable tissue and an electrical pulse of a certain voltage is needed to "capture" the myocardium to make the heart function. The minimum voltage to achieve this is called the threshold. As this is a probabilistic property, the actual voltage used is higher than the threshold (usually by a 50–100% margin). Additionally, the electrical pulse has a time component and proper description of a threshold is a voltage and pulse width.

All electrical circuits require a complete connection between the cathode and the anode. For some pacing leads, both connections to the heart are provided in a single lead ("bipolar") and some only provide a single connection ("unipolar"). In unipolar, the second connection is internally from the heart to the generator through the body (blood, tissue, etc.).

Also important is the impedance. The lower the impedance, the more current is needed to achieve the threshold voltage and lowers the battery life. The impedance is affected by the integrity of the pacing lead and the electrode-tissue interface of the lead with the heart.

=== Sensing and sensitivity ===
An important aspect of pacemaker function is sensing the intrinsic heart activity. This is called sensing. Larger sensed voltages are desired and it is expected that the ventricle produces larger voltages than the atria.

The minimum voltage to sense an event is called the sensitivity. The higher the sensitivity, the less that is sensed, and vice-versa. Too low of a sensitivity can cause troubles with sensing P waves, T waves, and noise; sensing these things is called "over sensing". A sensitivity too high may result in missed sensing of P waves in the atria and QRS in the ventricles, and is called "under sensing."

== Biventricular pacing ==
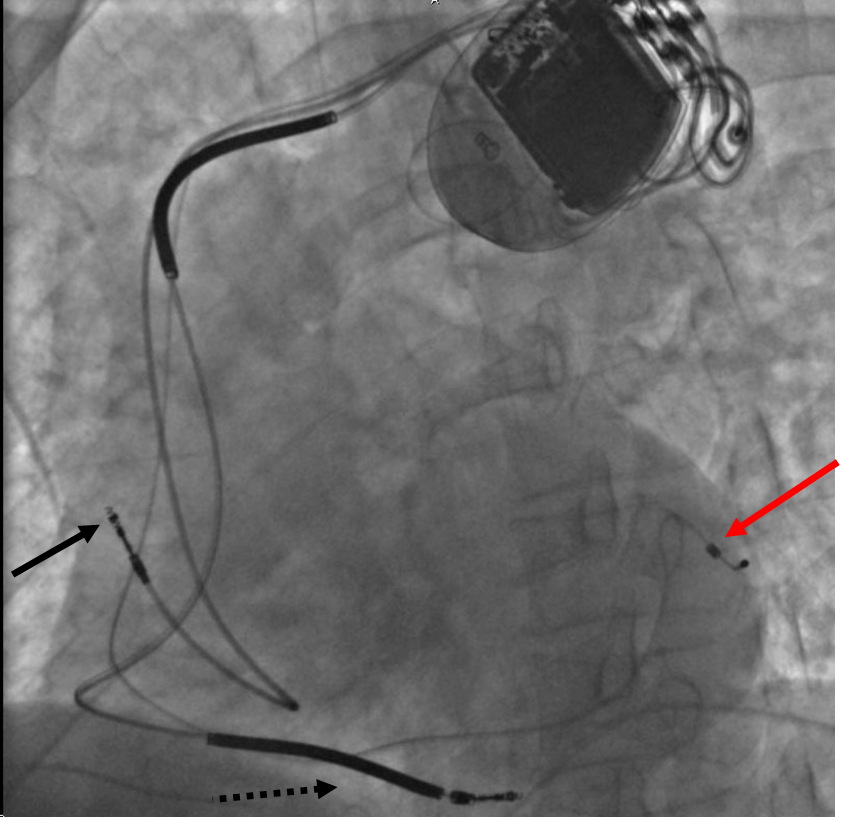
Three leads can be seen in this example of a cardiac resynchronization device: a right atrial lead (solid black arrow), a right ventricular lead (dashed black arrow), and a coronary sinus lead (red arrow). The coronary sinus lead wraps around the outside of the left ventricle, enabling pacing of the left ventricle. Note that the right ventricular lead in this case has two thickened aspects that represent conduction coils and that the generator is larger than typical pacemaker generators, demonstrating that this device is both a pacemaker and a cardioverter-defibrillator, capable of delivering electrical shocks for dangerously fast abnormal ventricular rhythms.

Cardiac resynchronization therapy (CRT) is used for people with heart failure in whom the left and right ventricles do not contract simultaneously (ventricular dyssynchrony), which occurs in approximately 25–50% of heart failure patients. To achieve CRT, a biventricular pacemaker (BVP) is used, which can pace both the septal and lateral walls of the left ventricle. By pacing both sides of the left ventricle, the pacemaker can resynchronize the ventricular contractions.

CRT devices have at least two leads, one passing through the vena cava and the right atrium into the right ventricle to stimulate the septum, and another passing through the vena cava and the right atrium and inserted through the coronary sinus to pace the epicardial wall of the left ventricle. Often, for patients in normal sinus rhythm, there is also a lead in the right atrium to facilitate synchrony with the atrial contraction. Thus, the timing between the atrial and ventricular contractions, as well as between the septal and lateral walls of the left ventricle can be adjusted to achieve optimal cardiac function.

CRT devices have been shown to reduce mortality and improve quality of life in patients with heart failure symptoms; a LV ejection fraction less than or equal to 35% and QRS duration on EKG of 120 ms or greater.

Biventricular pacing alone is referred to as CRT-P (for pacing). For selected patients at risk of arrhythmias, CRT can be combined with an implantable cardioverter-defibrillator (ICD): such devices, known as CRT-D (for defibrillation), also provide effective protection against life-threatening arrhythmias.

== Conduction System Pacing ==
Conventional placement of ventricular leads in or around the tip or apex of the right ventricle, or RV apical pacing, can have negative effects on heart function. It has been associated with increased risk of atrial fibrillation, heart failure, weakening of the heart muscle and potentially shorter life expectancy. His bundle pacing (HBP) and left bundle branch area pacing (LBBAP) leads to a more natural or perfectly natural ventricular activation and has generated strong research and clinical interest. By stimulating the His–Purkinje fiber network directly with a special lead and placement technique, HBP causes a synchronized and therefore more effective ventricular activation and avoids long-term heart muscle disease. HBP in some cases can also correct bundle branch block patterns.

== Advancements in function ==
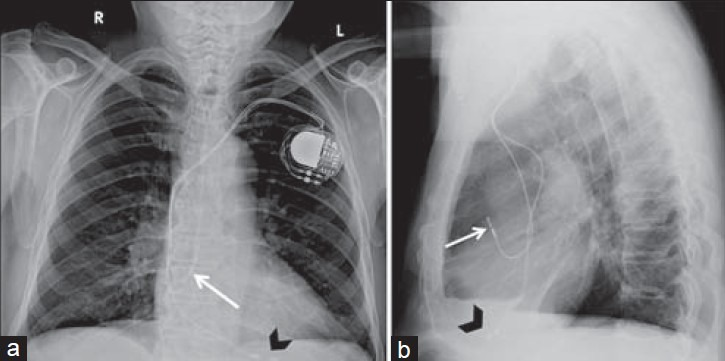
Posteroanterior and lateral chest radiographs of a pacemaker with normally located leads in the right atrium (white arrow) and right ventricle (black arrowhead), respectively

A major step forward in pacemaker function has been to attempt to mimic nature by utilizing various inputs to produce a rate-responsive pacemaker using parameters such as the QT interval, pO_{2} – pCO_{2} (dissolved oxygen or carbon dioxide levels) in the arterial-venous system, physical activity as determined by an accelerometer, body temperature, ATP levels, adrenaline, etc. Instead of producing a static, predetermined heart rate, or intermittent control, such a pacemaker, a 'Dynamic Pacemaker', could compensate for both actual respiratory loading and potentially anticipated respiratory loading. The first dynamic pacemaker was invented by Anthony Rickards of the National Heart Hospital, London, UK, in 1982.

Dynamic pacemaking technology could also be applied to future artificial hearts. Advances in transitional tissue welding would support this and other artificial organ/joint/tissue replacement efforts. Stem cells may be of interest in transitional tissue welding.

Many advancements have been made to improve the control of the pacemaker once implanted. Many of these have been made possible by the transition to microprocessor controlled pacemakers. Pacemakers that control not only the ventricles but the atria as well have become common. Pacemakers that control both the atria and ventricles are called dual-chamber pacemakers. Although these dual-chamber models are usually more expensive, timing the contractions of the atria to precede that of the ventricles improves the pumping efficiency of the heart and can be useful in congestive heart failure.

Rate responsive pacing allows the device to sense the physical activity of the patient and respond appropriately by increasing or decreasing the base pacing rate via rate response algorithms.

The DAVID trials have shown that unnecessary pacing of the right ventricle can exacerbate heart failure and increases the incidence of atrial fibrillation. The newer dual-chamber devices can keep the amount of right ventricle pacing to a minimum and thus prevent worsening of the heart disease.

== Considerations ==
=== Insertion ===
A pacemaker may be implanted whilst a person is awake using local anesthetic to numb the skin with or without sedation, or asleep using a general anesthetic. An antibiotic is usually given to reduce the risk of infection. Pacemakers are generally implanted in the front of the chest in the region of the left or right shoulder. The skin is prepared by clipping or shaving any hair over the implant site before cleaning the skin with a disinfectant such as chlorhexidine. An incision is made below the collar bone and a space or pocket is created under the skin to house the pacemaker generator. This pocket is usually created just above the pectoralis major muscle (prepectoral), but in some cases the device may be inserted beneath the muscle (submuscular). The lead or leads are fed into the heart through a large vein guided by X-ray imaging (fluoroscopy). The tips of the leads may be positioned within the right ventricle, the right atrium, or the coronary sinus, depending on the type of pacemaker required. Surgery is typically completed within 30 to 90 minutes. Following implantation, the surgical wound should be kept clean and dry until it has healed. Some movements of the shoulder within a few weeks of insertion carry a risk of dislodging the pacemaker leads.

The batteries within a pacemaker generator typically last 5 to 10 years. When the batteries are nearing the end of life, the generator is replaced in a procedure that is usually simpler than a new implant. Replacement involves making an incision to remove the existing device, disconnecting the leads from the old device and reconnecting them to a new generator, reinserting the new device and closing the skin.

==== Periodic pacemaker checkups ====
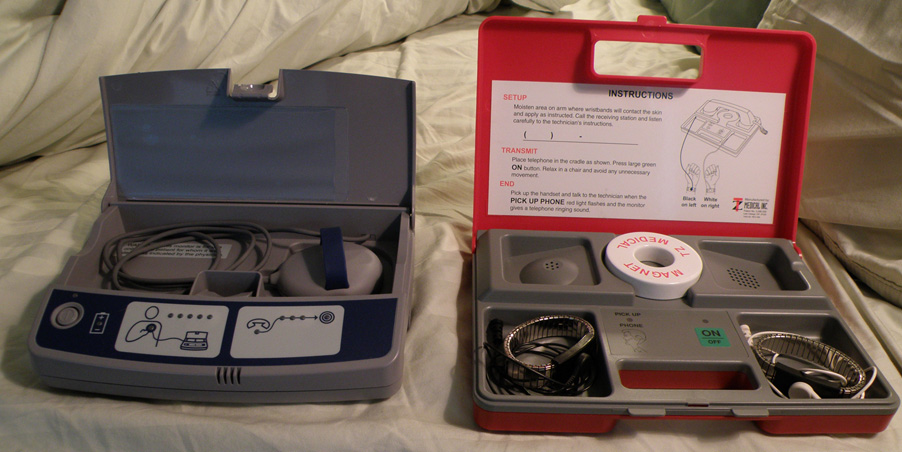
Two types of remote monitoring devices used by pacemaker patients

Once the pacemaker is implanted, it is periodically checked to ensure the device is operational and performing appropriately; the device can be checked as often as is deemed necessary. Routine pacemaker checks are typically done in-office every six months, though will vary depending upon patient/device status and remote monitoring availability. Newer pacemaker models can also be interrogated remotely, with the patient transmitting their pacemaker data using a transmitter at home connected to a cellular telephone network.

During in-office follow-up, diagnostic tests may include:

- Sensing: the ability of the device to "see" intrinsic cardiac activity (atrial and ventricular depolarization).
- Impedance: A test to measure lead integrity. Large and/or sudden increases in impedance can indicate a lead fracture, while large and/or sudden decreases in impedance can be caused by insulation failure.
- Threshold amplitude: The minimum voltage (generally in hundredths of volts) required in order to pace the atrium or ventricle connected to the lead.
- Threshold duration: The time that the device requires at the preset amplitude to reliably pace the atrium or ventricle connected to the lead.
- Percentage of pacing: The percentage of time that the pacemaker has been actively pacing since the previous device interrogation, which shows how dependent the patient is on the device.
- Estimated battery life at current rate: As modern pacemakers are "on-demand" and only pace when necessary, battery lifespan is affected by how much the pacemaker is utilized. Other factors affecting battery life include programmed output and algorithms (features) that use battery power.
- Any events that were stored since the last follow-up, in particular arrhythmias such as atrial fibrillation. These are typically stored based on specific criteria set by the physician and specific to the patient. Some devices have the availability to display intracardiac electrograms showing the onset of an event as well as the event itself, which helps to diagnose its cause or origin.

=== Magnetic fields, MRIs, and other lifestyle issues ===
A patient's lifestyle is usually not modified to any great degree after the insertion of a pacemaker. There are a few activities that are unwise, such as full-contact sports and exposure of the pacemaker to intense magnetic fields.

The pacemaker patient may find that some types of everyday actions need to be modified. For instance, the shoulder harness of a vehicle seatbelt may be uncomfortable if it falls across the pacemaker insertion site. Women will not be able to wear bras for a while after the operation, and later might have to wear bras with wide shoulder straps.

For some sports and physical activities, special pacemaker protection can be worn to prevent possible injuries, or damage to the pacemaker leads.

Pacemakers may be affected by magnetic or electromagnetic fields, and ionising and acoustic radiation. However, a 2013 study found that "The overall risk of clinically significant adverse events related to EMI (electromagnetic interference) in recipients of CIEDs (cardiovascular implantable electronic devices) is very low. Therefore, no special precautions are needed when household appliances are used. Environmental and industrial sources of EMI are relatively safe when the exposure time is limited and distance from the CIEDs is maximized. The risk of EMI-induced events is highest within the hospital environment." The study lists and tabulates many sources of interference, and many different potential effects: damage to circuitry, asynchronous pacing, etc. Some sources of hazard in older devices have been eliminated in newer ones.

Activities involving strong magnetic fields should be avoided. This includes activities such as arc welding with certain types of equipment, and maintaining heavy equipment that may generate strong magnetic fields. Some medical procedures, particularly magnetic resonance imaging (MRI), involve very strong magnetic fields or other conditions that may damage pacemakers.

However, many modern pacemakers are specified to be MR conditional or MRI conditional, safe to use during MRI subject to certain conditions. The first to be so specified was the Medtronic Revo MRI SureScan, approved by the US FDA in February 2011, which was the first to be specified as MR conditional. There are several conditions to use of MR Conditional pacemakers, including certain patients' qualifications and scan settings. An MRI conditional device has to have MRI settings enabled before a scan, and disabled afterwards.

As of 2014 the five most commonly used cardiac pacing device manufacturers (covering more than 99% of the US market) made FDA-approved MR-conditional pacemakers. The use of MRI may be ruled out by the patient having an older, non-MRI Conditional pacemaker, or by having old pacing wires inside the heart, no longer connected to a pacemaker.

A 2008 US study found that the magnetic field created by some headphones used with portable music players or cellphones may cause interference if placed very close to some pacemakers.

In addition, according to the American Heart Association, some home devices have the potential to occasionally inhibit a single beat. Cellphones do not seem to damage pulse generators or affect how the pacemaker works. It is recommended that objects containing magnets, or generating a significant magnetic field, should not be in close proximity to a pacemaker. Induction cooktops, in particular, can pose a risk.

Before medical procedures, the patient should inform all medical personnel that they have a pacemaker. Having a pacemaker does not imply that a patient requires the use of antibiotics to be administered before procedures such as dental work.

=== End-of-life care and pacemaker deactivation ===
A panel of the Heart Rhythm Society, a US specialist organization based in Washington, DC, deemed that it was legal and ethical to honor requests by patients, or by those with legal authority to make decisions for patients, to deactivate implanted cardiac devices. Lawyers say that the legal situation is similar to removing a feeding tube, though as of 2010 there was no legal precedent involving pacemakers in the United States. A patient in many jurisdictions (including the US) is deemed to have a right to refuse or discontinue treatment, including a pacemaker that keeps them alive. Physicians have a right to refuse to turn it off, but are advised by the HRS panel that they should refer the patient to a physician who will. Some patients consider that hopeless, debilitating conditions, such as severe strokes or late-stage dementia, can cause so much suffering that they would prefer not to prolong their lives with supportive measures.

=== Privacy and security ===
Security and privacy concerns have been raised with pacemakers that allow wireless communication. Unauthorized third parties may be able to read patient records contained in the pacemaker, or reprogram the devices, as has been demonstrated by a team of researchers. The demonstration worked at short range; they did not attempt to develop a long range antenna. The proof of concept exploit helps demonstrate the need for better security and patient alerting measures in remotely accessible medical implants. In response to this threat, Purdue University and Princeton University researchers have developed a prototype firewall device, called MedMon, which is designed to protect wireless medical devices such as pacemakers and insulin pumps from attackers.

=== Complications ===
Ultrasound showing non capture of a pacemaker

Complications from having surgery to implant a pacemaker are uncommon (each 1–3% approximately), but could include: infection where the pacemaker is implanted or in the bloodstream; allergic reaction to the dye or anesthesia used during the procedure; swelling, bruising or bleeding at the generator site, or around the heart, especially if the patient is taking blood thinners, elderly, of thin frame or otherwise on chronic steroid use.

A possible complication of dual-chamber artificial pacemakers is 'pacemaker-mediated tachycardia' (PMT), a form of reentrant tachycardia. In PMT, the artificial pacemaker forms the anterograde (atrium to ventricle) limb of the circuit and the atrioventricular (AV) node forms the retrograde limb (ventricle to atrium) of the circuit. Treatment of PMT typically involves reprogramming the pacemaker.

Another possible complication is "pacemaker-tracked tachycardia," where a supraventricular tachycardia such as atrial fibrillation or atrial flutter is tracked by the pacemaker and produces beats from a ventricular lead. This is becoming exceedingly rare as newer devices are often programmed to recognize supraventricular tachycardias and switch to non-tracking modes.

It is important to consider leads as a potential nidus for thromboembolic events. The leads are small-diameter wires from the pacemaker to the implantation site in the heart muscle, and are usually placed intravenously through the subclavian vein in order to access the right atrium. Placing a foreign object within the venous system in such a manner may disrupt blood-flow and allow for thrombus formation. Therefore, patients with pacemakers may need to be placed on anti-coagulation therapy to avoid potential life-threatening thrombosis or embolus.

These leads may also damage the tricuspid valve leaflets, either during placement or through wear and tear over time. This can lead to tricuspid regurgitation and right-sided heart failure, which may require tricuspid valve replacement.

Sometimes leads will need to be removed. The most common reason for lead removal is infection; however, over time, leads can degrade due to a number of reasons such as lead flexing. Changes to the programming of the pacemaker may overcome lead degradation to some extent. However, a patient who has several pacemaker replacements over a decade or two in which the leads were reused may require lead replacement surgery.

Lead replacement may be done in one of two ways. Insert a new set of leads without removing the current leads (not recommended as it provides additional obstruction to blood flow and heart valve function) or remove the current leads and then insert replacements. The lead removal technique will vary depending on the surgeon's estimation of the probability that simple traction will suffice to more complex procedures. Leads can normally be disconnected from the pacemaker easily, which is why device replacement usually entails simple surgery to access the device and replace it by simply unhooking the leads from the device to replace and hooking the leads to the new device. The possible complications, such as perforation of the heart wall, come from removing the lead{s} from the patient's body.

The free end of a pacemaker lead is actually implanted into the heart muscle with a miniature screw or anchored with small plastic hooks called tines. The longer the leads have been implanted (starting from a year or two), the more likely that they will have additional attachments to the patient's body at various places in the pathway from device to heart muscle, since the body tends to incorporate foreign devices into tissue. In some cases, for a lead that has been inserted for a short amount of time, removal may involve simple traction to pull the lead from the body. Removal in other cases is typically done with a laser or cutting device which threads like a cannula with a cutting edge over the lead and is moved down the lead to remove any organic attachments with tiny cutting lasers or similar device.

Pacemaker lead malposition in various locations has been described in the literature. Treatment varies, depending on the location of the pacer lead and symptoms.

Another possible complication called twiddler's syndrome occurs when a patient manipulates the pacemaker and causes the leads to be removed from their intended location and causes possible stimulation of other nerves.

Overall life expectancy with pacemakers is excellent, and mostly depends upon underlying diseases, presence of atrial fibrillation, age and sex at the time of first implantation.

== Other devices ==
Sometimes devices resembling pacemakers, called implantable cardioverter-defibrillators (ICDs) are implanted. These devices are often used in the treatment of patients at risk from sudden cardiac death. An ICD has the ability to treat many types of heart rhythm disturbances by means of pacing, cardioversion, or defibrillation. Some ICD devices can distinguish between ventricular fibrillation and ventricular tachycardia (VT), and may try to pace the heart faster than its intrinsic rate in the case of VT, to try to break the tachycardia before it progresses to ventricular fibrillation. This is known as fast-pacing, overdrive pacing, or anti-tachycardia pacing (ATP). ATP is only effective if the underlying rhythm is ventricular tachycardia, and is never effective if the rhythm is ventricular fibrillation.

NASPE / BPEG Defibrillator (NBD) code – 1993
I	II	III	IV
Shock chamber	Antitachycardia pacing chamber	Tachycardia detection	Antibradycardia pacing chamber
O = None	O = None	E = Electrogram	O = None
A = Atrium	A = Atrium	H = Hemodynamic	A = Atrium
V = Ventricle	V = Ventricle		V = Ventricle
D = Dual (A+V)	D = Dual (A+V)		D = Dual (A+V)

Short form of the NASPE/BPEG Defibrillator (NBD) code
ICD-S	ICD with shock capability only
ICD-B	ICD with bradycardia pacing as well as shock
ICD-T	ICD with tachycardia (and bradycardia) pacing as well as shock

== History ==
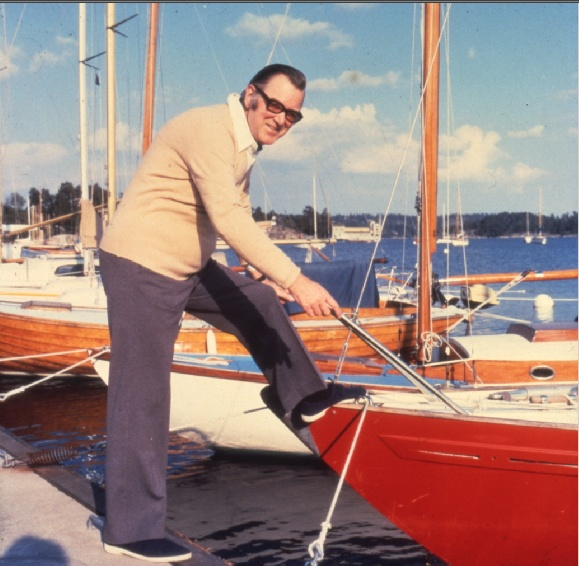
In 1958, Arne Larsson (1915–2001) became the first person to receive an implantable pacemaker. He had 26 devices during his life and campaigned for other patients needing pacemakers.

=== Origin ===
In 1889, John Alexander MacWilliam reported in the British Medical Journal (BMJ) of his experiments in which application of an electrical impulse to the human heart in asystole caused a ventricular contraction and that a heart rhythm of 60–70 beats per minute could be evoked by impulses applied at spacings equal to 60–70/minute.

In 1926, Mark C Lidwill of the Royal Prince Alfred Hospital of Sydney, supported by physicist Edgar H. Booth of the University of Sydney, devised a portable apparatus which "plugged into a lighting point" and in which "One pole was applied to a skin pad soaked in strong salt solution" while the other pole "consisted of a needle insulated except at its point, and was plunged into the appropriate cardiac chamber". "The pacemaker rate was variable from about 80 to 120 pulses per minute, and likewise the voltage variable from 1.5 to 120 volts". In 1928, the apparatus was used to revive a stillborn infant at Crown Street Women's Hospital in Sydney, whose heart continued "to beat on its own accord", "at the end of 10 minutes" of stimulation.

In 1932, American physiologist Albert Hyman, with the help of his brother, described an electro-mechanical instrument of his own, powered by a spring-wound hand-cranked motor. Hyman himself referred to his invention as an "artificial pacemaker", the term continuing in use to this day.

An apparent hiatus in the publication of research conducted between the early 1930s and World War II may be attributed to the public perception of interfering with nature by "reviving the dead". For example, "Hyman did not publish data on the use of his pacemaker in humans because of adverse publicity, both among his fellow physicians, and due to newspaper reporting at the time. Lidwell may have been aware of this and did not proceed with his experiments in humans".

=== Transcutaneous ===
In 1950, Canadian electrical engineer John Hopps designed and built the first external pacemaker based upon observations by cardio-thoracic surgeons Wilfred Gordon Bigelow and John Callaghan at Toronto General Hospital. The device was first tested on a dog at the University of Toronto's Banting Institute. A substantial external device using vacuum tube technology to provide transcutaneous pacing, it was somewhat crude and painful to the patient in use and, being powered from an AC wall socket, carried a potential hazard of electrocution of the patient and inducing ventricular fibrillation.

A number of innovators, including Paul Zoll, made smaller but still bulky transcutaneous pacing devices from 1952 using a large rechargeable battery as the power supply.

In 1957, William L. Weirich published the results of research performed at the University of Minnesota. These studies demonstrated the restoration of heart rate, cardiac output and mean aortic pressures in animal subjects with complete heart block through the use of a myocardial electrode.

In 1958 Colombian doctor Alberto Vejarano Laverde and Colombian electrical engineer Jorge Reynolds Pombo constructed an external pacemaker, similar to those of Hopps and Zoll, weighing 45 kg and powered by a 12 volt car lead–acid battery, but connected to electrodes attached to the heart. This apparatus was successfully used to sustain a 70-year-old priest, Gerardo Florez.

The development of the silicon transistor and its first commercial availability in 1956 was the pivotal event that led to the rapid development of practical cardiac pacemaking.

=== Wearable ===
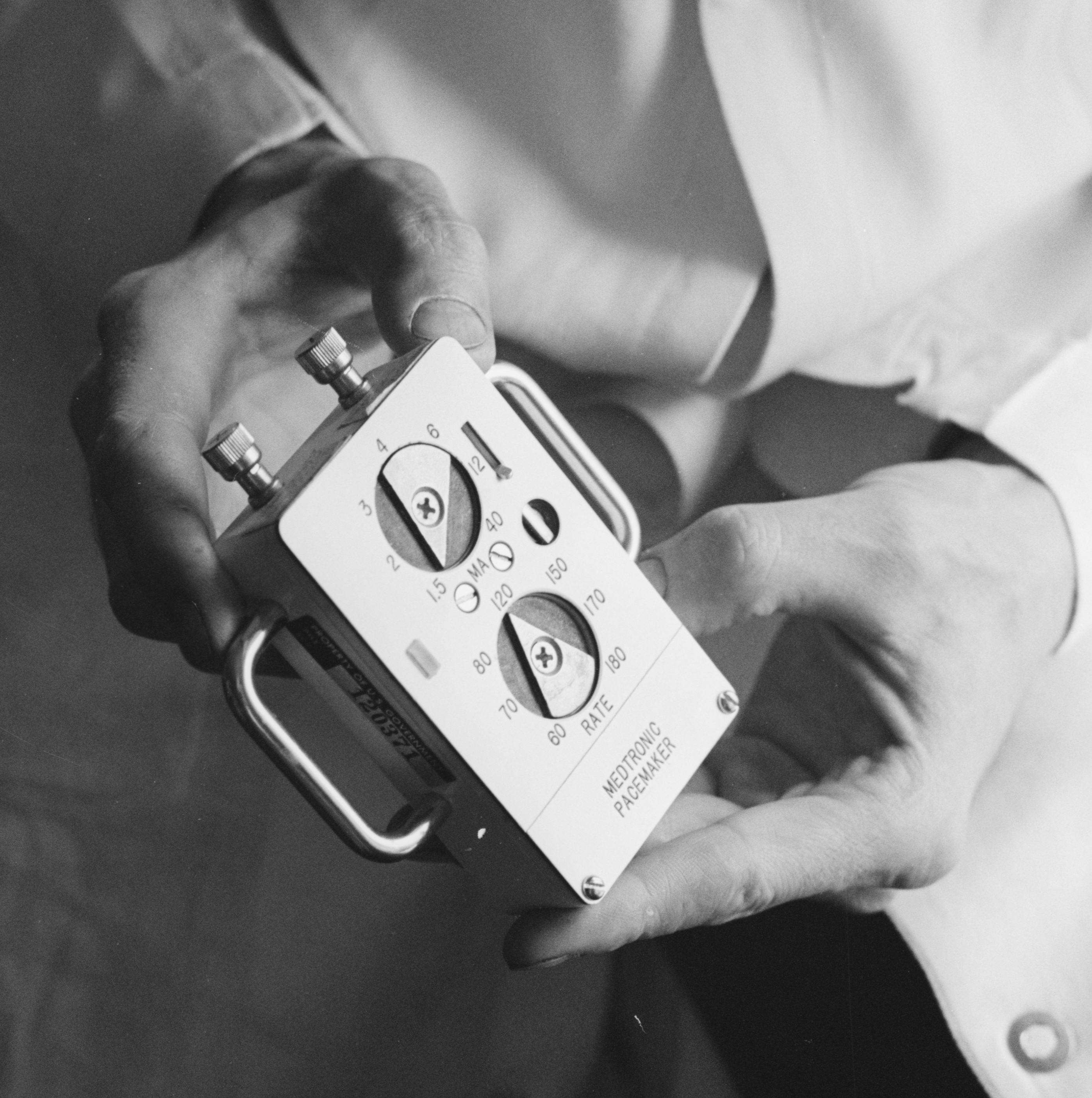
An external Medtronic pacemaker in 1961

In 1958, engineer Earl Bakken of Minneapolis, Minnesota, produced the first wearable external pacemaker for a patient of C. Walton Lillehei. This transistorized pacemaker, housed in a small plastic box, had controls to permit adjustment of pacing heart rate and output voltage and was connected to electrode leads which passed through the skin of the patient to terminate in electrodes attached to the surface of the myocardium of the heart.

In the UK in the 1960s, Lucas Engineering in Birmingham was asked by Mr Abrams of The Queen Elizabeth Hospital to produce a prototype for a transistorised replacement for the electro-mechanical product. The team was headed by Roger Nolan, an engineer with the Lucas Group Research Centre. Nolan designed and created the first blocking oscillator and transistor-powered pacemaker. This pacemaker was worn on a belt and powered by a rechargeable sealed battery, enabling users to live a more-normal life.

One of the earliest patients to receive this Lucas pacemaker device was a woman in her early 30s. The operation was carried out in 1964 by South African cardiac surgeon Alf Gunning, a student of Christiaan Barnard. This pioneering operation took place under the guidance of cardiac consultant Peter Sleight at the Radcliffe Infirmary in Oxford and his cardiac research team at St George's Hospital in London.

=== Implantable ===
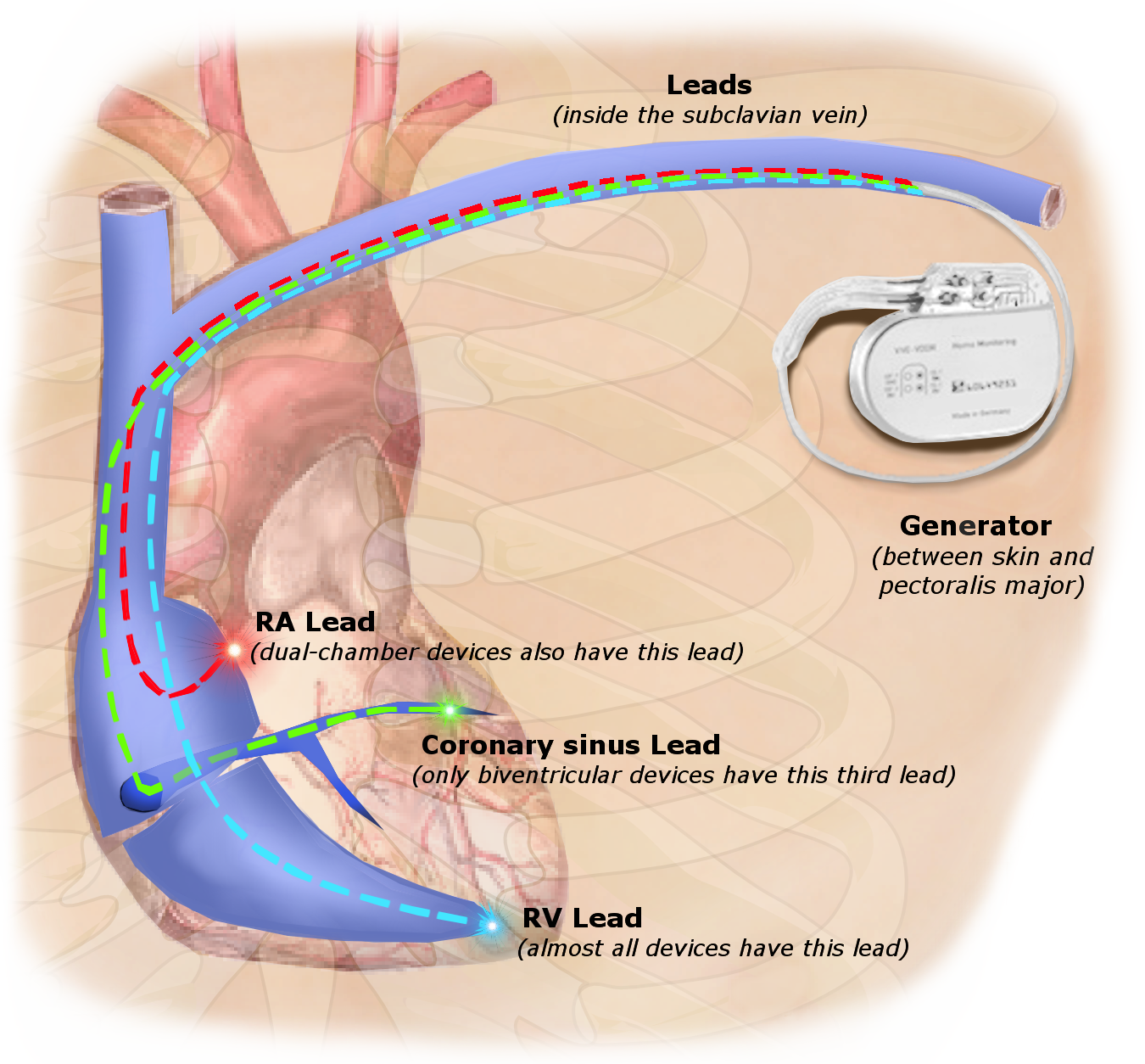
Illustration of implanted cardiac pacemaker showing locations of cardiac pacemaker leads

The first clinical implantation into a human of a fully implantable pacemaker was on October 8, 1958, at the Karolinska Institute in Solna, Sweden, using a pacemaker designed by inventor Rune Elmqvist and surgeon Åke Senning (in collaboration with Elema-Schönander AB, later Siemens-Elema AB), connected to electrodes attached to the myocardium of the heart by thoracotomy. The device failed after three hours. A second device was then implanted which lasted for two days. The world's first implantable pacemaker patient, Arne Larsson, went on to receive 26 different pacemakers during his lifetime. He died in 2001, at the age of 86, outliving the inventor and the surgeon.

In 1959, temporary transvenous pacing was first demonstrated by Seymour Furman and John Schwedel, whereby the catheter electrode was inserted via the patient's basilic vein.

In February 1960, an improved version of the Swedish Elmqvist design was implanted by Doctors Orestes Fiandra and Roberto Rubio in the Casmu 1 Hospital of Montevideo, Uruguay. This pacemaker, the first implanted in the Americas, lasted until the patient died of other ailments, nine months later. The early Swedish-designed devices used batteries recharged by an induction coil from the outside.

Implantable pacemakers constructed by engineer Wilson Greatbatch entered use in humans from April 1960 following extensive animal testing. The Greatbatch innovation varied from the earlier Swedish devices in using primary cells (a mercury battery) as the energy source. The first patient lived for a further 18 months.

The first use of transvenous pacing in conjunction with an implanted pacemaker was by Parsonnet in the United States, Lagergren in Sweden and Jean-Jacques Welti in France in 1962–63. The transvenous, or pervenous, procedure involved incision of a vein into which was inserted the catheter electrode lead under fluoroscopic guidance, until it was lodged within the trabeculae of the right ventricle. This became the method of choice by the mid-1960s.

Cardiothoracic surgeon Leon Abrams and medical engineer Ray Lightwood developed and implanted the first patient-controlled variable-rate heart pacemaker in 1960 at the University of Birmingham. The first implant took place in March 1960, with two further implants the following month. These three patients made good recoveries and returned to a high quality of life. By 1966, 56 patients had undergone implantation with one surviving for over 5 1/2 years.

=== Nuclear ===
In early 1969, researchers at the National Heart Institute began experimenting with a nuclear-powered pacemaker. The devices used heat from plutonium-238, a highly radioactive isotope, to generate electricity; shielding prevented exposure of the patient and others to radiation. A bulletproof and cremation-proof titanium case protected the element from rupture, and the electrical components were covered in epoxy. An early experimental implantation was done on a dog named Brunhilde.

The first human implantation was reported in the December 1970 edition of Nuclear News and was performed by a French team. The devices were designed to last ten years without surgical intervention; some lasted as long as thirty. As of 2003, an estimated 50-100 people in the United States were estimated to have a plutonium pacemaker; at least one patient who received the device in 1975 had a (non-functional) plutonium pacemaker present as late as 2019.

The project was ultimately shelved because of concerns from the Nuclear Regulatory Commission about the availability of plutonium in the public sphere.

=== Lithium battery ===
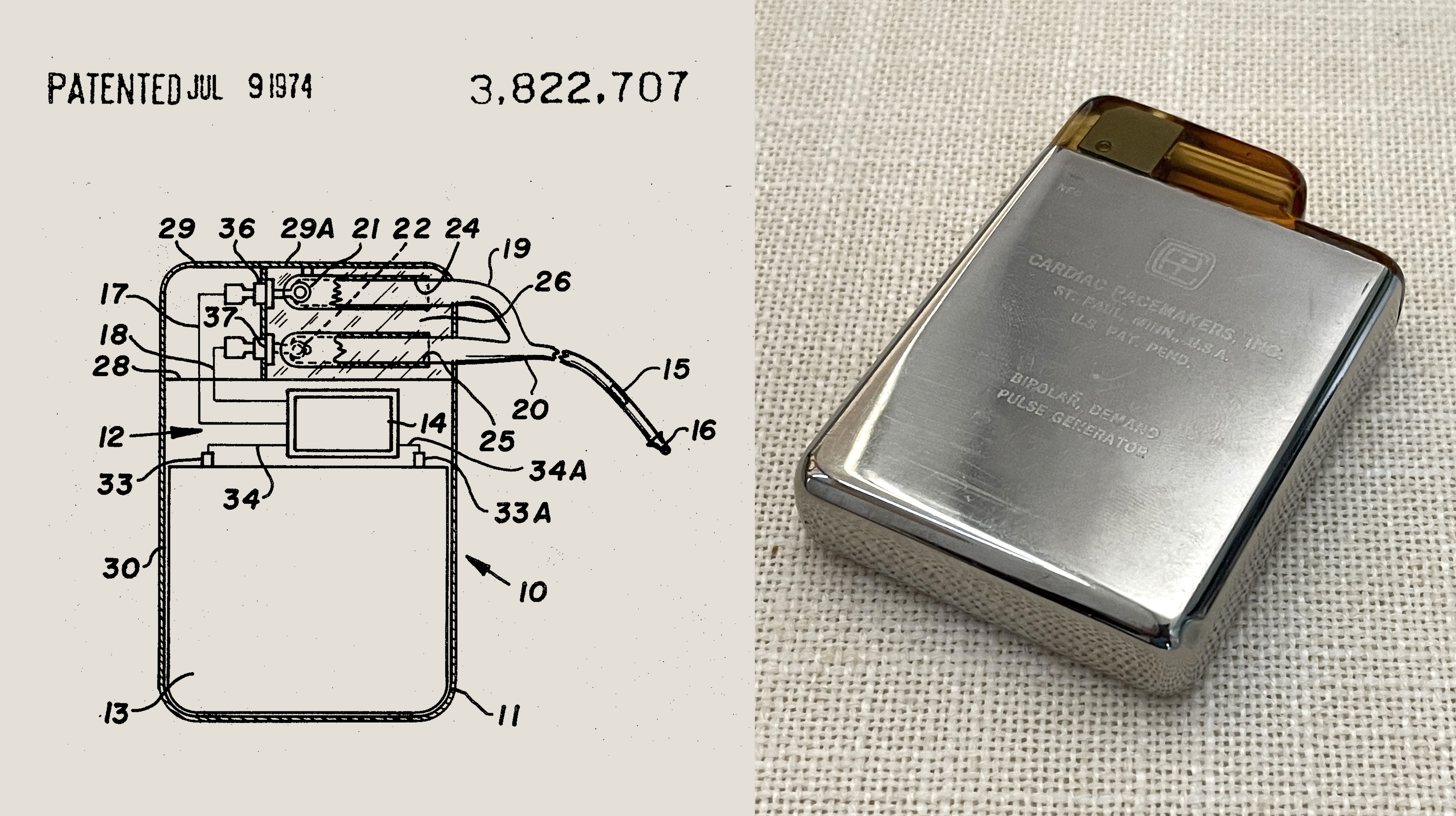
The first lithium-iodide cell-powered pacemaker. Invented by Anthony Adducci and Art Schwalm. Cardiac Pacemakers Inc. 1972

The preceding implantable devices all suffered from the unreliability and short lifetime of the available primary cell technology, mainly the mercury battery. In the late 1960s, several companies, including ARCO in the US, developed isotope-powered pacemakers, but this development was overtaken by the development in 1971 of the lithium iodide cell by Wilson Greatbatch. Lithium-iodide or lithium anode cells became the standard for pacemaker designs.

A further impediment to the reliability of the early devices was the diffusion of water vapor from body fluids through the epoxy resin encapsulation, affecting the electronic circuitry. This phenomenon was overcome by encasing the pacemaker generator in a hermetically sealed metal case, initially by Telectronics of Australia in 1969, followed by Cardiac Pacemakers, Inc. of St. Paul, Minnesota in 1972. This technology, using titanium as the encasing metal, became the standard by the mid-1970s.

On July 9, 1974, Manuel A. Villafaña and Anthony Adducci, the founders of Cardiac Pacemakers, Inc. (Guidant), manufactured the world's first pacemaker with a lithium anode and a lithium-iodide electrolyte solid-state battery. Lithium-iodide or lithium anode cells increased the life of pacemakers from one year to as long as eleven years, and has become the standard for pacemaker designs. They began designing and testing their implantable cardiac pacemaker powered by a new longer-life lithium battery in 1971. The first patient to receive a CPI pacemaker emerged from surgery in June 1973.

Liza Morton was fitted with an implantable pacemaker at 11 days old in 1978, at Glasgow's Yorkhill hospital, Scotland. She was the youngest baby to bear such an implant at the time.

=== Intra-cardial ===
In 2013, several firms announced devices that could be inserted via a leg catheter rather than invasive surgery. The devices are roughly the size and shape of a pill, much smaller than the size of a traditional pacemaker. Once implanted, the device's prongs contact the muscle and stabilize heartbeats. Development of this type of device was continuing. In November 2014, Bill Pike of Fairbanks, Alaska, received a Medtronic Micra pacemaker in Providence St Vincent Hospital in Portland, Oregon. D. Randolph Jones was the EP doctor. Also in 2014, St. Jude Medical Inc. announced the first enrollments in the company's leadless Pacemaker Observational Study evaluating the Nanostim leadless pacing technology. The Nanostim pacemaker received European CE marking in 2013. Post-approval implant trials were carried out in Europe. The European study was stopped after reports of six perforations that led to two patient deaths. After investigations, St Jude Medical restarted the study. In the United States, this therapy had not been approved by the FDA as of 2014. While the St Jude Nanostim and the Medtronic Micra are single-chamber pacemakers, it was anticipated that leadless dual-chamber pacing for patients with atrioventricular block would become possible with further development.

=== Reusable pacemakers ===
Worldwide each year, in a simple procedure to avoid explosions, thousands of pacemakers are removed from bodies to be cremated. Pacemakers with significant remaining battery life are potentially life-saving devices for people in low- and middle-income countries (LMICs). The Institute of Medicine, a US non-governmental organization, has reported that inadequate access to advanced cardiovascular technologies is a major contributor to cardiovascular disease morbidity and mortality in LMICs. Ever since the 1970s, multiple studies worldwide have reported on the safety and efficacy of pacemaker reuse. As of 2016, widely acceptable standards for safe pacemaker and ICD reuse had not been developed, and there continued to be legal and regulatory barriers to widespread adoption of medical device reuse.

== In animals ==
Pacemakers have also been implanted in animals such as cats, dogs and horses. A surgery performed in 2012 by the University of Minnesota was the first time a pacemaker was implanted into a cat in Minnesota, and a 2001 surgery performed by the Hertfordshire Royal Veterinary college was the first time a pacemaker had been implanted into a horse in the U.K., with trials only being conducted in the U.S. and the Netherlands, as well as France. In contrast, canine pacemaker surgeries have been undertaken since the 1980s.

Cats and dogs are able to use human pacemakers, with horses receiving pacemakers roughly the size of a box of matches. For dogs and horses, surgery is able to be performed through minimally invasive jugular incision and suturing until the pacemaker reaches the heart. Due to their small stature, cats require epicardial surgeries, in contrast to the transvenous surgeries provided to dogs and horses. According to a study from the Journal of American Veterinary Education, "Transvenous pacemaker implantation has been reported in only 5 cats 5–9 due to the small patient size, limited vascular access relative to the size of available endocardial leads,"

Donated pacemakers can be implanted in animals, which reduces costs for pet owners. Donated pacemakers are especially convenient, since pacemaker insertions are usually carried out on sick and elderly animals who will not outlive the pacemaker's battery. Despite this, vet appointments to monitor battery and malfunctions are still recommended every 6-12 months. Despite product similarities and compatibility, animal pacemaker typically cost around US$3,500-4,000 in the late 2010s, while a human pacemaker typically costs around $8,000. Aftercare for animals who have undergone pacemaker insertions are challenging, with proper rest being hard to induce in animals, with dogs especially recovering quickly after surgery, and wanting to exert themselves through run and play. Despite the fact that animal patients of pacemaker insertion are usually released a day after surgery, a rest period of 1 month is recommended.

== Manufacturers ==
Existing and former manufacturers of implantable pacemakers:

- Biotronik (Germany)
- Boston Scientific (US)
- Cardiac Pacemaker Inc.; Guidant (US) (later owned by Boston Scientific)
- Intermedics (US)
- Lepu Medical (China)
- Medico (Italy)
- Medtronic (US)
- Sorin Group (Italy) (merged with Cyberonics to form LivaNova; in 2018, LivaNova sold its cardiac rhythm management business unit to MicroPort for $190M )
- St. Jude Medical (US) (later owned by Abbott Laboratories)
- Abbott (US)

== See also ==
- Biological pacemaker
- Button cell
- Electrical conduction system of the heart
- Implantable cardioverter-defibrillator
- Infective endocarditis
- Pacemaker syndrome
