= St. Jude Medical =

Global medical device company based in Little Canada, Minnesota

- Type: Public
- Traded as: NYSE: STJ
- Industry: Medical devices
- Founded: Saint Paul, Minnesota, 1976
- Founder: Manuel A. Villafana
- Defunct: January 4, 2017
- Fate: Acquired by Abbott Laboratories
- Headquarters: Little Canada, Minnesota
- Area served: Worldwide
- Key people: Michael T. Rousseau, chairman, president and chief executive officer John C. Heinmiller, executive vice president Michael T. Rousseau, chief operating officer Donald J. Zurbay, vice president of finance and chief financial officer
- Products: Cardiac rhythm management devices Implantable cardioverter-defibrillators Neuromodulation devices
- Revenue: $5.6 billion (2014) ▲
- Total assets: $10.207 billion (2014) ▲
- Total equity: $4.2 billion (2014) ▲
- Number of employees: 18,000
- Website: www.sjm.com

St. Jude Medical, Inc. was an American global medical device company headquartered in Little Canada, Minnesota, U.S., a suburb of Saint Paul. The company had more than 20 principal operations and manufacturing facilities worldwide with products sold in more than 100 countries. Its major markets include the United States, Europe, Latin America and Asia-Pacific. The company was named after Jude the Apostle, the patron saint of lost causes.

St. Jude Medical was founded in 1976 and went public in 1977, and the company has been listed in the Fortune 500 every year since 2010. The company was acquired by Abbott Laboratories in January 2017.

Michael T. Rousseau was the company's president and chief executive officer from 2016 until its acquisition by Abbott.

== History ==
=== Early history ===
St. Jude Medical was founded in 1976 to further develop bi-leaflet artificial heart valves, which were originally created in 1972 at the University of Minnesota. St. Jude Medical's bi-leaflet valve was developed in large part by Demetre Nicoloff of the University of Minnesota and St. Jude Medical employee Don Hanson.

Company founder Manny Villafana took St. Jude Medical public in February 1977. In October of that year, Dr. Nicoloff implanted the company's first artificial heart valve in a human patient. St. Jude's new heart valve was coated in pyrolytic carbon, which helped the valve prevent blood clotting.

St. Jude founding chief operating officer LaVerne Rees became chief executive officer in 1981. Shortly after his appointment as St. Jude Medical CEO, Rees directed the company to begin development of its own carbon coating. This decision led to a legal battle with CarboMedics, the sole supplier of carbon coating for the company's heart valves. The St. Jude board reassigned Rees in late 1984 after the legal dispute continued.

In 1985, Lawrence Lehmkuhl replaced Rees as president and CEO of St. Jude Medical. Lehmkuhl had been a division president at American Hospital Supply Corporation. Shortly after the appointment, St. Jude Medical settled its lawsuit with CarboMedics. The two companies also entered into an agreement that allowed St. Jude Medical to continue developing and producing limited quantities of its own carbon coating.

In 1986, the first St. Jude Medical heart valve created with the company's own carbon coating technology was implanted into a human in Germany. Later that year, St. Jude expanded into tissue heart valves with its acquisition of BioImplant.

=== 1990s ===
The company established its International Division, located in Brussels, Belgium, in 1990. In April 1991, St. Jude Medical engaged in a joint venture with Hancock Jaffe Laboratories to create Heart Valve Company. The joint venture was formed to design and market new tissue heart valves for the American market. The first Heart Valve Company tissue heart valve was implanted in a human patient in 1994.

In March 1993, Ronald Matricaria, a former president of Eli Lilly & Company's North American division, replaced Lehmkuhl as president and CEO of St. Jude Medical. Lehmkuhl, who had presided over a ninefold increase in annual sales during his tenure as CEO, was named chairman of the St. Jude Medical board.

Matricaria pushed for increasing diversification and expanded St. Jude Medical's acquisition hunt. In June 1994, the company announced that it would acquire the Pacesetter, Inc., the heart pacemaker division of Siemens AG, for $500 million. At the time of its acquisition by St. Jude Medical, Pacesetter was the second largest pacemaker manufacturer worldwide.

In January 1996, St. Jude Medical further diversified its business when it acquired Minnetonka, Minnesota-based Daig Corporation for $425 million. Daig Corporation manufactured cardiac catheters for diagnostic and therapeutic uses. Also in January of that year, St. Jude Medical became the sole owner of Heart Valve Company when it purchased Hancock Jaffe Laboratories' 50% share in the joint venture. St. Jude Medical acquired Biocor Industria, a Brazilian manufacturer of tissue heart valves, in September 1996.

In 1997, St. Jude Medical acquired Ventritex, a Sunnyvale, California-based manufacturer of implantable cardioverter-defibrillators for $352 million. At the time of its acquisition, Ventritex was the third-largest manufacturer of defibrillators.

In February 1999, St. Jude Medical acquired Tyco International's Angio-Seal business. Angio-Seal manufactured collagen-based plugs to close arterial holes made during arterial catheter procedures. Matricaria stepped down as St. Jude Medical CEO in March 1999. He was replaced by Terry Shepherd, who had been president of St. Jude Medical's heart valve business since 1994. Matricaria retained chairmanship of the St. Jude Medical board.

=== 2000s ===
In 2004, St. Jude Medical CEO Terry Shepherd retired. The company's stock had increased 277% during his tenure as CEO. St. Jude Medical COO Daniel Starks was appointed to replace Shepherd as the company's CEO. Starks was CEO of Daig Corporation from 1986 to 1996, when St. Jude Medical acquired the company. Starks had been retained by St. Jude Medical and had been chief operating officer since 2001.

In January 2005, St. Jude acquired Saint Paul, Minnesota-based Endocardial Solutions for $272 million. Endocardial Solutions manufactured diagnostic and therapeutic devices used to treat atrial fibrillation. Later that year the company acquired Plano, Texas-based Advanced Neuromodulation Systems for $1.3 billion. At the time of its acquisition, Advanced Neuromodulation Systems was the second-largest supplier of devices that use electrotherapy to treat chronic pain and nerve disorders.

In 2008, St. Jude acquired MediGuide, an Israeli company that developed technology that uses tiny sensors to locate medical devices inside of a patient's body and increase the amount of information available to a doctor during medical procedures.

=== 2010s ===
St. Jude acquired AGA Medical for $1.3 billion in October 2010. AGA Medical was a Plymouth, Minnesota-based company that manufactured products that treat heart defects, including plugs and patches that fix holes and other cardiac defects. In 2010 the company also acquired LightLab Imaging, a company that developed optical coherence tomography technology that helps doctors treat heart disease.

In 2010, St. Jude invested in an option to acquire CardioMEMS Inc., a medical device company that developed a wireless sensing and communication technology to monitor pulmonary artery pressure (PAP) in heart failure patients. CardioMEMS Inc. was acquired by St. Jude Medical in May 2014.

In August 2012, St. Jude reorganized its business operations. The company folded its four product divisions into two operating units: the implantable electronic systems division; and the cardiovascular and ablation technologies division. The company also centralized other functions including the marketing, information technology and legal departments. St. Jude Medical's reorganization coincided with layoffs of about 5% of the company's global workforce.

In 2013, St. Jude acquired Endosense, a Swiss company that developed a catheter that measures the force a doctor places on a patient's heart wall during a catheter ablation procedure. St. Jude Medical paid $330 million for the company.

In June 2013, St. Jude entered into a series of agreements under which the company made a $40 million equity investment in Spinal Modulation, Inc. In May 2015, the company completed the acquisition of Spinal Modulation, developer of the Axium Neurostimulator System.

St. Jude acquired Nanostim Inc., a Sunnyvale, California-based privately owned developer of miniaturized, leadless pacemakers, for $123.5 million in October 2013. The acquisition followed the approval of Nanostim's leadless pacemaker by the European Union. St. Jude Medical had secured the exclusive right to acquire Nanostim with a May 2011 investment in the start-up.

St. Jude continued the restructuring it started in 2014 with its consolidation of the company's two operating units—the implantable electronic systems and the cardiovascular and ablation technologies units—into single research and development division. The company also consolidated its worldwide manufacturing and supply chain operations into a second division.

In July 2015, the company announced its intention to acquire heart-device manufacturer Thoratec Corporation for $3.4 billion. The acquisition was completed in October 2015.

In September 2015, St. Jude announced that Daniel Starks would retire as chairman, president, and chief executive officer. On January 1, 2016, Michael T. Rousseau succeeded Starks as president and CEO. Starks remained executive chairman.

In late April 2016, Abbott Laboratories announced it would acquire St. Jude Medical for $25 billion ($46.75 in cash & 0.8708 shares of Abbott common stock, equating to an approximate value of $85 per share).

In January 2017, Abbott announced that it had completed its $25 billion acquisition of St. Jude Medical.

=== Acquisition history ===
The following is an illustration of the company's major mergers and acquisitions and historical predecessors (this is not a comprehensive list):

- St. Jude Medical
  - - - - - - - - - - - - - - - - - - St. Jude Medical
                                      (Est 1976)
                                - - Pacesetter, Inc.
                                    (Acq 1994)
                              - - Daig Corporation
                                  (Acq 1996)
                            - - Heart Valve Company
                                (Acq remaining 50% from joint venture with Hancock Jaffe Laboratories' 1996)
                          - - Biocor Industria
                              (Acq 1996)
                        - - Ventritex
                            (Acq 1997)
                      - - Tyco International
                          (Angio-Seal div, Acq 1999)
                    - - Endocardial Solutions
                        (Acq 2005)
                  - - Advanced Neuromodulation Systems
                      (Acq 2005)
                - - MediGuide
                    (Acq 2008)
              - - AGA Medical
                  (Acq 2010)
            - - LightLab Imaging
                (Acq 2010)
          - - CardioMEMS Inc.
              (Acq 2014)
        - - Endosense
            (Acq 2013)
      - - Spinal Modulation
          (Acq 2015)
    - - Nanostim Inc
        (Acq 2013)
  - Thoratec Corporation (Acq 2015)
    - Apica Cardiovascular Limited
      (Acq 2014)
    - - Levitronix
        (Acq 2011)
      - - Getinge Group
          (Heart pump technology div, Acq 2014)
        - - Thermo Cardiosystems
            (Acq 2010)

== Operations ==
St. Jude Medical manufactures implantable cardioverter-defibrillators (ICD); pacemakers; electrophysiology catheters; vascular closure products; cardiac mapping and visualization systems; optical coherence tomography (OCT) imaging systems; structural heart repair products; and neurostimulation devices. The company's operations are divided into two divisions: research and development; and manufacturing and supply chain.

St. Jude Medical also operates six technology centers located in Brussels, Belgium, Beijing, China, Tokyo, Japan, Austin, Texas, St. Paul, Minnesota and Sylmar, California. These centers offer training to physicians and allow them to simulate patient procedures using St. Jude Medical devices and technologies.

== Products ==
The company also manufactures implantable cardioverter-defibrillators (ICDs) and implanted cardiac resynchronization devices (CRT-Ds). The ICDs and CRT-Ds use quadripolar lead technology, which utilizes four electrodes on a single lead to pace multiple locations on the left side of the heart.

In 2013, the company began marketing the Ilumen Optis device, which is a diagnostic and assessment tool for patients with coronary artery disease. The device uses fractional flow reserve for measuring intra-arterial pressure and optical coherence tomography technology, which allows doctors to visually examine inside a patient's arteries.

== Technology ==
=== MediGuide ===
St. Jude Medical produces MediGuide, a cardiac navigation and visualization technology that provides real-time fluoroscopic images. The system also gives doctors the ability to locate devices that are implanted with MediGuide-enabled sensors. MediGuide reduces the duration of a patients' radiation exposure during cardiovascular procedures.

=== Nanostim ===
In October 2013, the company acquired and began developing Nanostim leadless pacemakers. Nanostim technology consists of a miniaturized pacemaker implanted by a percutaneous, catheter-based procedure and placed into the heart. They are designed without the requirement for a lead, the thin wires inserted through a vein which connect the generator to the heart, or surgical pocket.

=== CardioMEMS ===
In June 2014, St. Jude acquired and began developing CardioMEMS HF System, a wireless pulmonary artery pressure (PAP) monitoring technology. The wireless monitoring technology is used to assess cardiac performance via measurement of PAP and can be placed into the pulmonary artery.

== Controversies ==
In December 2010, St. Jude Medical voluntarily stopped selling its Riata and Riata ST line of defibrillator leads over concerns that the leads were susceptible to insulation abrasion. The Food and Drug Administration issued a recall of the leads in November 2011. In May 2013, Population Health Research Institute (PHRI), an academic health science research institute, conducted an independent analysis of data received from ongoing prospective registries that monitor the performance of the Durata and Riata ST ICD leads. The results of the analysis found that the insulated leads had a 99.8 percent rate of freedom from all-cause insulation abrasion at 5 years.

In January 2013, the Food and Drug Administration sent St. Jude a warning letter detailing concerns regarding processes at the company's Sylmar, California facility. The letter was sent following inspections of the plant in September and October 2012. The letter did not raise any safety concerns about St. Jude Medical products.

That same month the company sent the Food and Drug Administration a 34-page letter detailing the company's efforts to correct problems found during the October inspection.

In 2014 a security vulnerability in St. Jude's pacemakers was reported by MedSec Holdings Ltd and confirmed by the FDA.
