= Dewdney (surname) =

Dewdney is an English name that has existed since before 1500.

== List of people with the surname ==
- Alexander Dewdney (1941–2024), Canadian mathematician, computer scientist and philosopher
- Anna Dewdney (1965–2016), American author and illustrator of children's books
- Christopher Dewdney (born 1951), Canadian poet
- Edgar Dewdney (1835–1916), Canadian surveyor, engineer, politician, and provincial Lieutenant-Governor
- Selwyn Dewdney (1909–1979), Canadian author, illustrator and artist, father of Alexander and Christopher
- Tom Dewdney (born 1933), West Indian cricketer

== See also ==
- Dudeney
