= Anthony Adducci =

Inventor and entrepreneur

Anthony J. Adducci
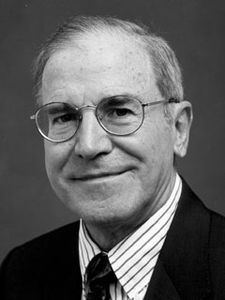
- Born: August 14, 1937; Chicago, Illinois
- Died: September 19, 2006 (aged 69); Scottsdale, Arizona
- Resting place: Resurrection Cemetery, Mendota Heights, Minnesota
- Other names: A.J., Tony
- Education: 1959 BS Physics at Saint Mary's University of Minnesota
- Occupations: Inventor and entrepreneur
- Known for: Co-founding Cardiac Pacemakers, Inc., the company that manufactured the world's first lithium battery powered artificial pacemaker
- Spouse: Sandra Gordon

Anthony J. Adducci (August 14, 1937 – September 19, 2006) was a pioneer of the medical device industry in Minnesota. He is best known for co-founding Cardiac Pacemakers, Inc., the company that manufactured the world's first lithium battery-powered artificial pacemaker. The lithium-iodide cell revolutionized the medical industry and is now the standard cell for pacemakers.

== Early life and education ==
Adducci was born in Chicago, Illinois on August 14, 1937, to Alexander James Adducci and Valeria Maria (Vigna, Bona) Adducci. Adducci's maternal grandfather, Lorenzo Valerio Bona, was Juventus FC forward and Commander and Grand Officer of the Order of the Crown of Italy. Adducci's family originated from the town of Alessandria del Carretto in Italy.

In 1951, he graduated from St. Catherine of Genoa Grammar School, in the Roseland neighborhood of Chicago. He attended Saint Mary's University of Minnesota, receiving the BS in Physics in 1959. He pursued additional study in electrical engineering at Illinois Institute of Technology and in business administration at the University of Minnesota.

== Career ==
=== Jensen Manufacturing ===
In 1960, Adducci was employed as an acoustical engineer for the Jensen Manufacturing Company in Chicago, Illinois where he engaged in the design and development of loudspeakers and horns.

=== International Telephone and Telegraph ===
In 1961, he joined International Telephone and Telegraph Corporation in Chicago Illinois where, as a development engineer, he instructed numerous training courses on digital data communication systems and as a senior test engineer directed ITT personnel in electro-interference testing of the Boeing Minuteman (missile) for the Strategic Air Command. He also taught high-level courses to the United States Air Force in Biloxi, Mississippi.

While in Chicago in 1963, Adducci worked with a local physician and developed an electronic ear thermometer used to detect the time of ovulation in the human female. He developed an earplug and a recording device that would measure the tympanic temperature and got his wife, who was a nurse, to measure her temperatures, and they were able to predict ovulations. They published a paper in an IEEE journal (Institute of Electrical and Electronics Engineers) biomedical area.

=== Sperry Rand Corporation ===
In August 1964, he accepted a position with the Sperry Rand Corporation's UNIVAC Division in St. Paul, Minnesota as a system design engineer engaged in the logic design of computer peripheral equipment.

=== Medtronic ===
In April 1966, he was hired by Earl Bakken, CEO of Medtronic as a Sales Engineer. Adducci was the ninetieth employee at the time. While at Medtronic he served in various technical and marketing responsibilities including, sales administration manager, and pacemaker consulting specialist. He taught surgeons around the United States the basics of how pacemakers work and how to insert the pacemaker into the body. Adducci was involved in over fifty surgeries while at Medtronic.

=== Cardiac Pacemakers Inc. (CPI) ===
Cardiac Pacemakers, Inc. was founded by Anthony Adducci, Manny Villafaña, Arthur Schwalm, and James Baustert, each with experience in a different aspect of the pacemaker business. All four had built their careers at Medtronic. The founding partners had multiple lawsuits by and against Medtronic, all settled out of court.

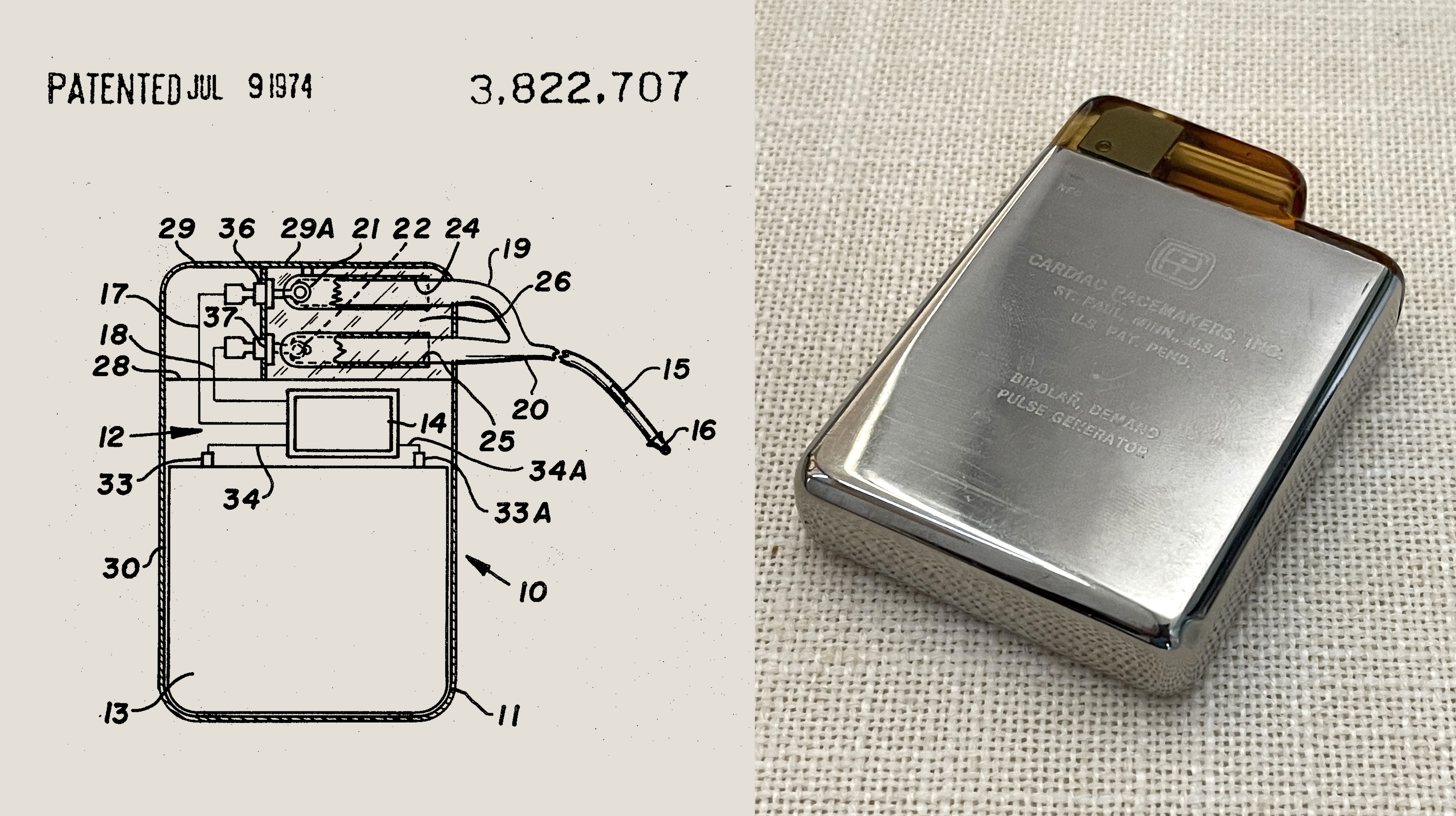
The world's first lithium-iodide cell-powered pacemaker. Invented by Anthony Adducci. Cardiac Pacemakers, Inc. 1972

The first $50,000 capitalization for CPI was raised from a phone booth on the Minneapolis skyway system. They began designing and testing their implantable cardiac pacemaker powered with the world's first longer-life lithium battery in 1971. The first CPI pacemaker was implanted in June 1973.

==== Acquisition and mergers ====
In early 1978, CPI was concerned about a friendly takeover attempt. Despite impressive sales, the company's stock price had fluctuated wildly the year before, dropping from $33 to $11 per share. Some speculated that the stock was being sold short, while others attributed the price to the natural volatility of high-tech stock. As a one-product company, CPI was susceptible to changing market conditions, and its founders knew they needed to diversify. They considered two options: acquiring other medical device companies or being acquired themselves. They chose the latter.

Several companies expressed interest in acquiring CPI, including 3M, American Hospital Supply, Pfizer, and Johnson & Johnson. However, Eli Lilly, one of America's premier pharmaceutical companies, was the most enthusiastic suitor. "Lilly had the research expertise, highly compatible interests, and similar values," Anthony Adducci recalls. "At CPI, we haven't been able to dedicate the dollars and time necessary to develop new products beyond our staple lithium-powered pacemaker. Lilly was a $2 billion company. We knew they had tremendous resources, especially in research and development." Additionally, Eli Lilly and CPI were already interested in developing insulin pumps, and Lilly was working with cardiovascular drugs, a natural link to CPI's heart pacemaker business.

Before the final negotiations in late 1978, there were numerous flights between Minneapolis and Indianapolis for CPI principals and representatives of Piper, Jaffray & Hopwood's corporate finance department. Finally, both sides sat down at the bargaining table at a motel in suburban Bloomington, Minnesota – Lilly, the pharmaceutical giant, and CPI, the upstart pacemaker company. CPI's negotiation team included Anthony Adducci, Art Schwalm, Tom King, and Hunt Greene.

The company sold 8,500 pacemakers increasing sales from zero in 1972 to over $47 million. In December 1978, it was acquired by Eli Lilly and Company for $127 million.

== Board of directors ==
- Catholic Charities of the Archdiocese of St. Paul/Minneapolis
- Trustee of Saint Mary's University of Minnesota.
- Development Committee of the North American College of Rome
- Health Advisory Council of the College of St. Catherine in St. Paul, Minnesota
- Horizon Industries (founding director)
- Deltec in Arden Hills (founding director)
- Check Technology (founding director)
- Medical Graphics Corporation in Vandais Heights (founding director)
- Dimensional Medicine in Minnetonka (founding director)
- Delphax in Minnetonka (founding director)
- CAPSULE design in Minneapolis (founding director)
- North American Banking Companies (founding director)

== Philanthropy ==
Adducci founded The Adducci Family Foundation. A Charitable foundation with a special interest in child abuse, battered woman and special educational programs for the elderly.

With donations and support, Saint Mary's University of Minnesota named the science building to Adducci Science Center.

== Honors ==
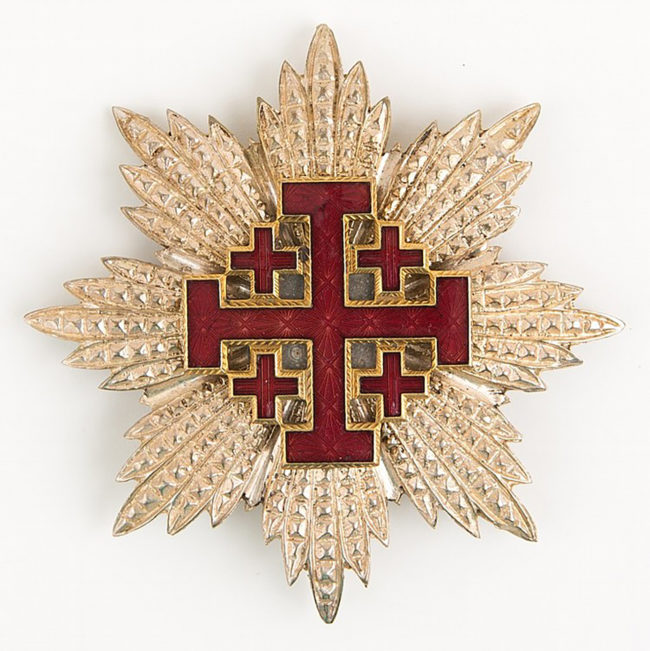
The Knight Grand Cross is the highest rank encountered.

- Induction into the Minnesota Science and Technology Hall of Fame
- Knight Grand Cross of the Order of the Holy Sepulchre of Jerusalem
- Knight in the Order of Malta.
- Commander of the Maricopa County Sheriff's Office Community Service Posse.
- 2nd degree black belt in Tae Kwon Do Karate
- 4th degree black belt in Aikido and founder of the Minnesota Ki Society.
- Saint Mary's University Distinguished Alumnus
- Saint Mary's University Heritage Award

== Publications ==
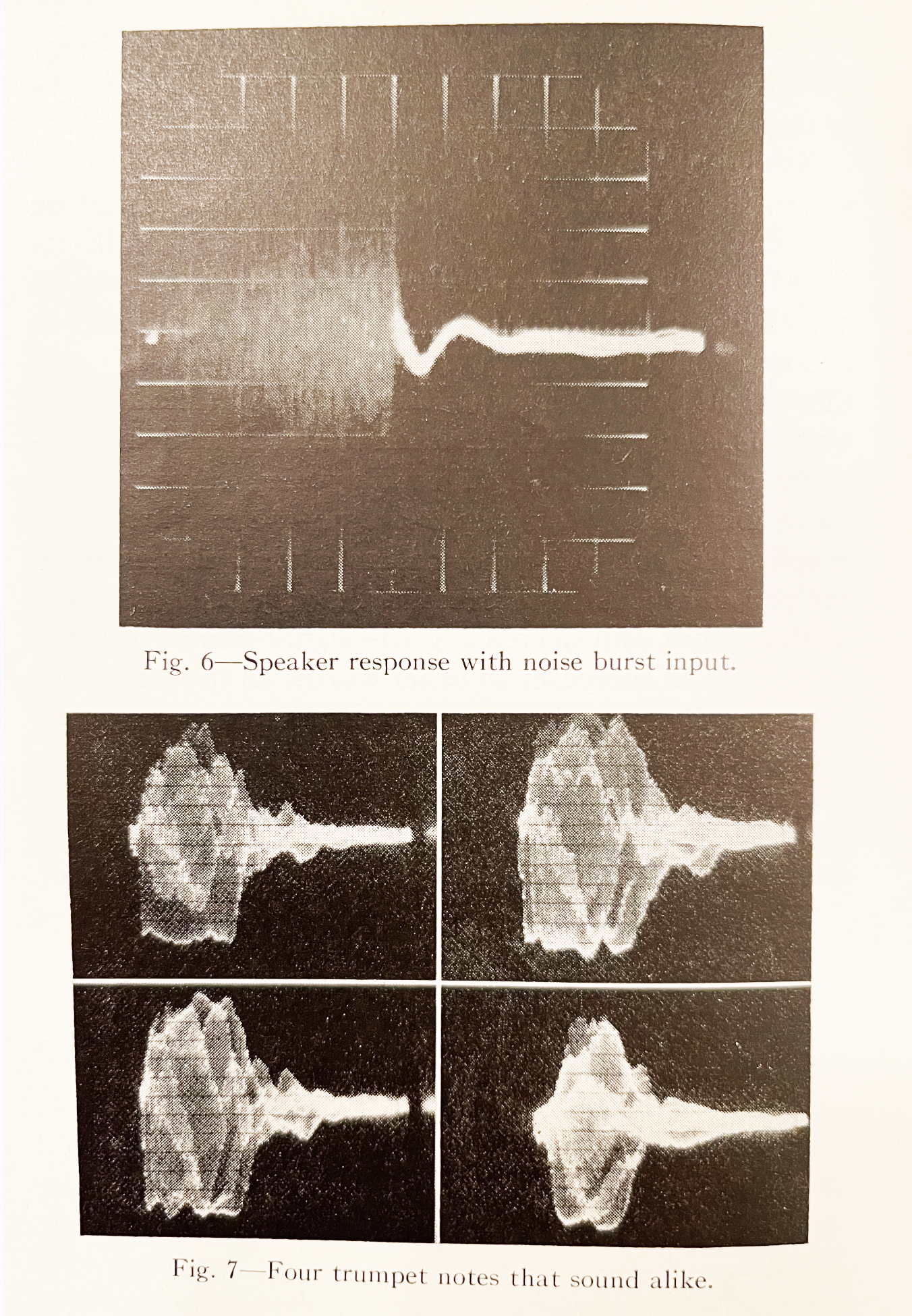
Speaker response with noise burst input. Trumpet notes that sound alike. "Transient Distortion in Loudspeakers", May–June 1961

- "Transient Distortion in Loudspeakers", May–June 1961
- "Ovulation Detection by Internal Cranial Temperature Measurements", January, 1965
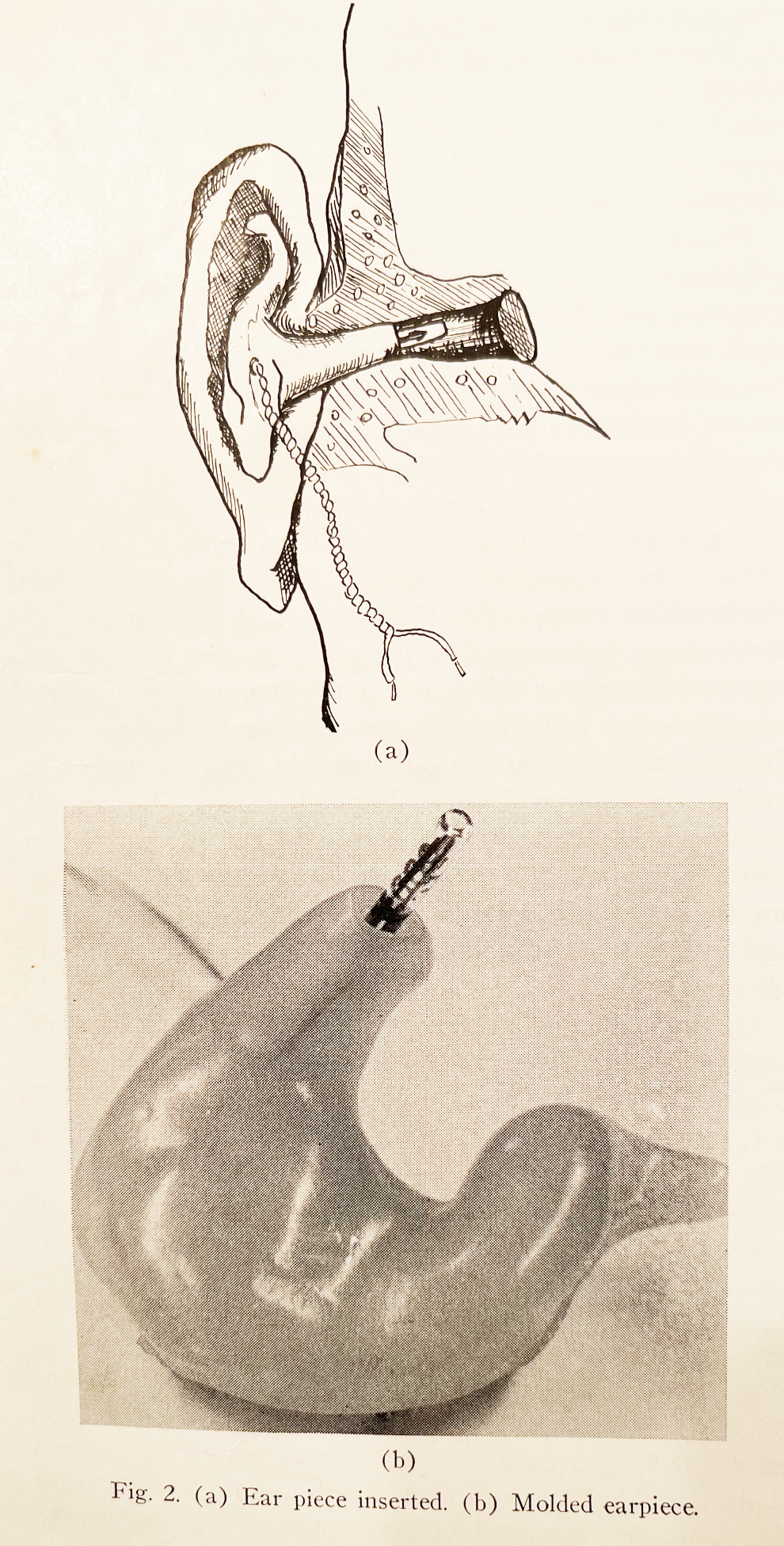
  "Ovulation Detection by Internal Cranial Temperature Measurements", January, 1965

== Held patents ==
- PT#: 3822707 Metal-Enclosed Cardiac Pacer with Solid-State Power Source – Image Document
- PT#: 3822707 Metal-Enclosed Cardiac Pacer with Solid-State Power Source – Text Document

An improved heart pacer including the conventional combination of a pulse generator, electrode means, and electrode leads coupling the pulse generator to the electrodes, wherein the battery power source of the pulse generator is a solid-state battery with a lithium anode and a lithium-iodide electrolyte.(see Wilson Greatbatch, ed.). The pacer structure is enclosed in a hermetically sealed metallic enclosure, with means being provided in the enclosure for passing electrode leads in sealed relationship therethrough. The outer surface of the casing is polished metal (Note: In the patent claim the term polished metal was used as an all-encompassing description. The initial commercial artificial pacemaker, under the patent in 1972, used stainless steel as a non-hermetic encasing medium. Continuing research led to use of the more biologically compatible titanium in a welded hermetically sealed pacemaker in 1976) and is continuous in all areas. In certain instances, the continuity may be with the exception of the zone through which the external electrode leads pass.

== Personal ==
In August 1998 he became the Commander of the Maricopa County Sheriff's Office Community Service Posse in Arizona.

Adducci was married to Sandra Gordon. They had three children: Michael, Brian, and Alicia and six grandchildren.

Adducci died in Scottsdale, Arizona on September 19, 2006, of Multifocal motor neuropathy at the age of 69.
