= Pacemaker failure =

Malfunction of an artificial pacemaker

Pacemaker failure is the inability of an implanted artificial pacemaker to perform its intended function of regulating the beating of the heart. A pacemaker uses electrical impulses delivered by electrodes in order to contract the heart muscles. Failure of a pacemaker is defined by the requirement of repeat surgical pacemaker-related procedures after the initial implantation. Most implanted pacemakers are dual chambered and have two leads, causing the implantation time to take longer because of this more complicated pacemaker system. These factors can contribute to an increased rate of complications which can lead to pacemaker failure.

Approximately 2.25 million pacemakers were implanted in the United States between 1990 and 2002, and of those pacemakers, about 8,834 were removed from patients because of device malfunction most commonly connected to generator abnormalities. In the 1970s, results of an Oregon study indicated that 10% of implanted pacemakers failed within the first month. Another study found that more than half of pacemaker complications occurred during the first 3 months after implantation. Causes of pacemaker failure include lead related failure, unit malfunction, problems at the insertion site, failures related to exposure to high voltage electricity or high intensity microwaves, and a miscellaneous category (one patient had ventricular tachycardia when using his electric razor and another patient had persistent pacing of the diaphragm muscle). Pacemaker malfunction has the ability to cause serious injury or death, but if detected early enough, patients can continue with their needed therapy once complications are resolved.

== Symptoms ==
- Moderate dizziness or lightheadedness
- Syncope
- Slow or fast heart rate
- Discomfort in chest area
- Palpitations
- Hiccups

== Causes ==
=== Direct factors ===
- Lead dislodgement
  - A Macro-dislodgement is radiographically visible.
  - A Micro-dislodgement is a minimal displacement in the lead that is not visible in a chest X-ray, but has the ability to increase the capture threshold and eventually cause a loss of capture.
  - Lead dislodgement can cause sensing failure, which occurs when proper atrial or ventricular sensing is not achieved by the programming of the pacemaker. Ventricular lead dislodgement is less common compared to atrial lead dislodgement.
  - Causes
    - Twiddler's Syndrome
      - The patient's constant manipulation of the pulse generator within its skin pocket can lead to a dislodgement of the device. The generator is rotated on its longitudinal axis, which causes traction and results in a lead dislodgement.
    - Reel's Syndrome
      - Like Twiddler's Syndrome, it is the manipulation of the pulse generator, but instead the generator is rotated on its transverse axis, which rolls the lead around the generator, creating dislodgement.
    - Direct trauma over the system.
- Lead fracture
- Unit malfunction
  - Battery failure, component malfunction, or generator failure
- Problems at the insertion site
  - Infection of the insertion site can cause local inflammation or the formation of an abscess in the pulse generator pocket.
  - Infection can cause the erosion of part of the pacing system that is in the skin.
- Failures related to exposure to high voltage electricity or high intensity microwaves

=== Indirect factors ===
- Power-generating equipment, arc welding equipment and powerful magnets (as in medical devices, heavy equipment or motors) can inhibit pulse generators. Patients who work with or near such equipment should know that their pacemakers may not work properly in those conditions.
- With the advances of technology, Federal Communications Commission (FCC) is making new frequencies available. Cellphones using these new frequencies might make pacemakers less reliable. A group of cellphone companies is studying that possibility.
- Equipment used by doctors and dentists can affect pacemakers.
- Magnetic resonance imaging (MRI) uses a powerful magnet to produce images of internal organs and their functions. Metal objects are attracted to the magnet and are normally not allowed near MRI machines. The magnet can interrupt the pacing and inhibit the output of pacemakers. If MRI must be done, the pacemaker output in some models can be reprogrammed. In February 2011, the FDA approved an MRI-safe pacemaker.
- Extracorporeal shock-wave lithotripsy (ESWL) procedure is safe for most pacemaker patients, with some reprogramming of the pacing. Careful follow-up after the procedure is required. Patients with certain kinds of pacemakers implanted in the abdomen should avoid ESWL.
- Diagnostic radiation (such as screening X-ray) appears to have no effect on pacemaker pulse generators. However, therapeutic radiation (such as for treating cancerous tumors) may damage the pacemaker's circuits. The degree of damage is unpredictable and may vary with different systems. However, the risk is significant and builds up as the radiation dose increases. The American Heart Association recommends that the pacemaker be shielded as much as possible, and moved if it lies directly in the radiation field.
- Short-wave or microwave diathermy uses high-frequency, high-intensity signals. These may bypass pacemaker's noise protection and interfere with or permanently damage the pulse generator.

== Prevention ==
- Lead displacement
  - Adequate surgical implantation.
  - Usage of active fixation leads.
  - Verification of lead position 24–48 hours implantation.

== Treatment ==
- Lead displacement
  - Early displacements: surgical repositioning of the lead or lead repositioning via percutaneous access.
  - Late displacements: implanting a new lead in the chamber where displacement has occurred.

== See also ==
- Pacemaker crosstalk
