= Leonard Dudeney =

- Born: 1875; Brighton
- Died: 1956 (aged 80–81); London
- Education: Bedford Modern School
- Known for: Editor and journalist

Leonard Dudeney (1875–1956) was an English newspaper editor, journalist and confidant of Ramsay MacDonald. He was acting and assistant editor in Shanghai for the North China Daily News between 1902 and 1907, Parliamentary Gallery and Lobby correspondent at the Daily Express between 1916 and 1918 and held the same position at the Daily Sketch between 1921 and 1944. As editor of the Leicester Pioneer between 1908 and 1911, when Ramsay MacDonald was MP for Leicester, MacDonald regularly sought counsel from Dudeney on Far Eastern matters where Dudeney was experienced and connected.

== Early life ==
Leonard Dudeney was born in Brighton in 1875, the son of George and Jane Dudeney. He was the eldest of eight children, and educated initially at Brighton Grammar School. His father was a merchant, and his family moved to Bedford at some point during his teenage years, where he continued his education at Bedford Modern School, between 1887 and 1992, matriculating at the University of London in 1892 but instead starting a career in journalism.

== Career ==
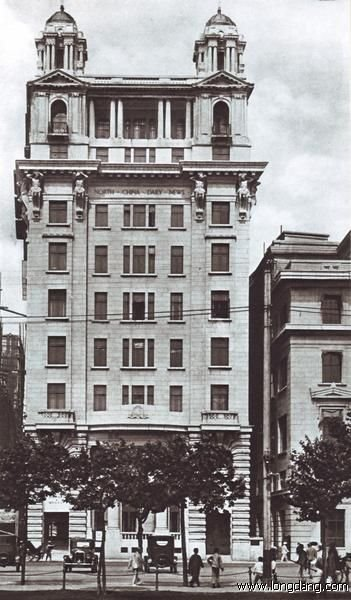
Offices of the North China Daily News

Dudeney started his journalistic career in 1892 with the Brighton Gazette. He became editor of the Farnham Herald in 1898 and was made Assistant Editor of the Aldershot News in 1900.

After his marriage in July 1902, Leonard and his wife moved to Shanghai where he was made acting and assistant editor of the North China Daily News, once described as the most influential foreign newspaper of its time. He was acting and assistant editor of the newspaper until 1907 and lived throughout that time in Shanghai where he was a member of the Shanghai Club.

Dudeney returned to England in 1907 where he was made Editor of the Leicester Pioneer at the time when Ramsay MacDonald was MP for Leicester. MacDonald regularly sought counsel from Dudeney on Far Eastern matters as a result of Dudeney's intimate knowledge of the region derived from his time as acting and assistant editor of the North China Daily News and they became friends. In the 1910 General Election, MacDonald faced a fierce Conservative opponent in John Foster Fraser and awaited the result of the poll with considerable apprehension. On the day of the poll, Dudeney had news of the birth of his first child, a baby daughter, and rushed to see MacDonald to avail him of the news and the decision of Dudeney and his wife to name the child Ramsay Ellen Dudeney in MacDonald's honour. Dudeney's obituary in The Times reports that MacDonald's demeanour immediately changed and that the news was ‘an omen of victory’ for the result; Ramsay MacDonald won the seat.

Dudeney left the Leicester Pioneer in 1911 when he became Labour sub-editor of the Daily Citizen until 1915. He was parliamentary correspondent at the Daily Express between 1916 and 1918, and was a journalist at the Paris Peace Conference after World War I. In 1921 Dudeney became Parliamentary Gallery and Lobby correspondent at the Daily Sketch, a position he held until 1944 when he retired from staff journalism.

== Family life ==
Dudeney married Ellen Higginson, daughter of the late Charles Higginson, at Kew on 31 July 1902. Outside of work, he had a great passion for politics, drama, music and walking. He was a member of the National Liberal Club.

Dudeney died at home in Ealing on 31 December 1956 and was survived by his wife, two sons and a daughter. His youngest son, Wilfrid Dudeney, became an important sculptor and was President of the Royal Society of British Sculptors between 1971 and 1975. One of Wilfrid's works was a public monument in New Street Square in the City of London, a tribute to Britain's great newspaper industry. It was saved from demolition by Christopher Wilson who, like Wilfrid's father, was also an Old Bedford Modernian and journalist on Fleet Street. Wilfrid Dudeney's work now resides at the Worshipful Company of Goldsmiths.
