= Christopher Wilson (biographer) =

British writer

- Born: 1947 (age 78–79); Lancashire
- Occupations: Journalist, novelist and Biographer
- Known for: Royal Biographer

Christopher Wilson (born 1947) is a journalist, novelist (as TP Fielden), and biographer.

== Life ==
Wilson was born in Lancashire in 1947, the son of a naval officer. He was educated at Bedford Modern School.

Wilson began his career at the Bedfordshire Times before moving to Fleet Street to work for the Daily Mail and the Sunday Telegraph. He subsequently worked for ITV as one of the first environment correspondents.

After ITV, Wilson returned to Fleet Street as diplomatic correspondent of the Daily Express, later becoming the William Hickey columnist, a position previously held by Nigel Dempster. Following his tenure at the Daily Express, Wilson continued his career as a columnist for The Times, The Daily Telegraph and Today before becoming a full-time royal biographer.

Wilson lectures on the British royal family and is a regular contributor to TV documentaries and debates on the subject. He has been associate producer of three Channel Four documentaries on royalty, and in 2022 was chief commentator on Queen Elizabeth II's death and funeral for Al Jazeera TV.

In 2009 he was appointed a Visiting Lecturer at the University of Winchester.

In February 2017, as TP Fielden, he published The Riviera Express (HarperCollins/HQ), first in a series of 1950s murder mysteries featuring Miss Dimont, former naval Intelligence officer turned local newspaper reporter. Commencing in 2020 a new series, set in wartime Buckingham Palace and featuring artist/courtier/spy Guy Harford, was published by Thomas & Mercer.

== Student journalism ==
As a result of the death of a young colleague in the 1983 Harrods bombing, Wilson founded in conjunction with St Edmund Hall, Oxford, the Philip Geddes Awards. These encourage student journalists into the profession, and form the core of British journalism's longest-established independent charity which, since its inception, has granted would-be writers prize money worth over £100,000. In recognition of this work Wilson was elected an honorary member of St Edmund Hall's senior common room in 1998.

== The Three Printers ==
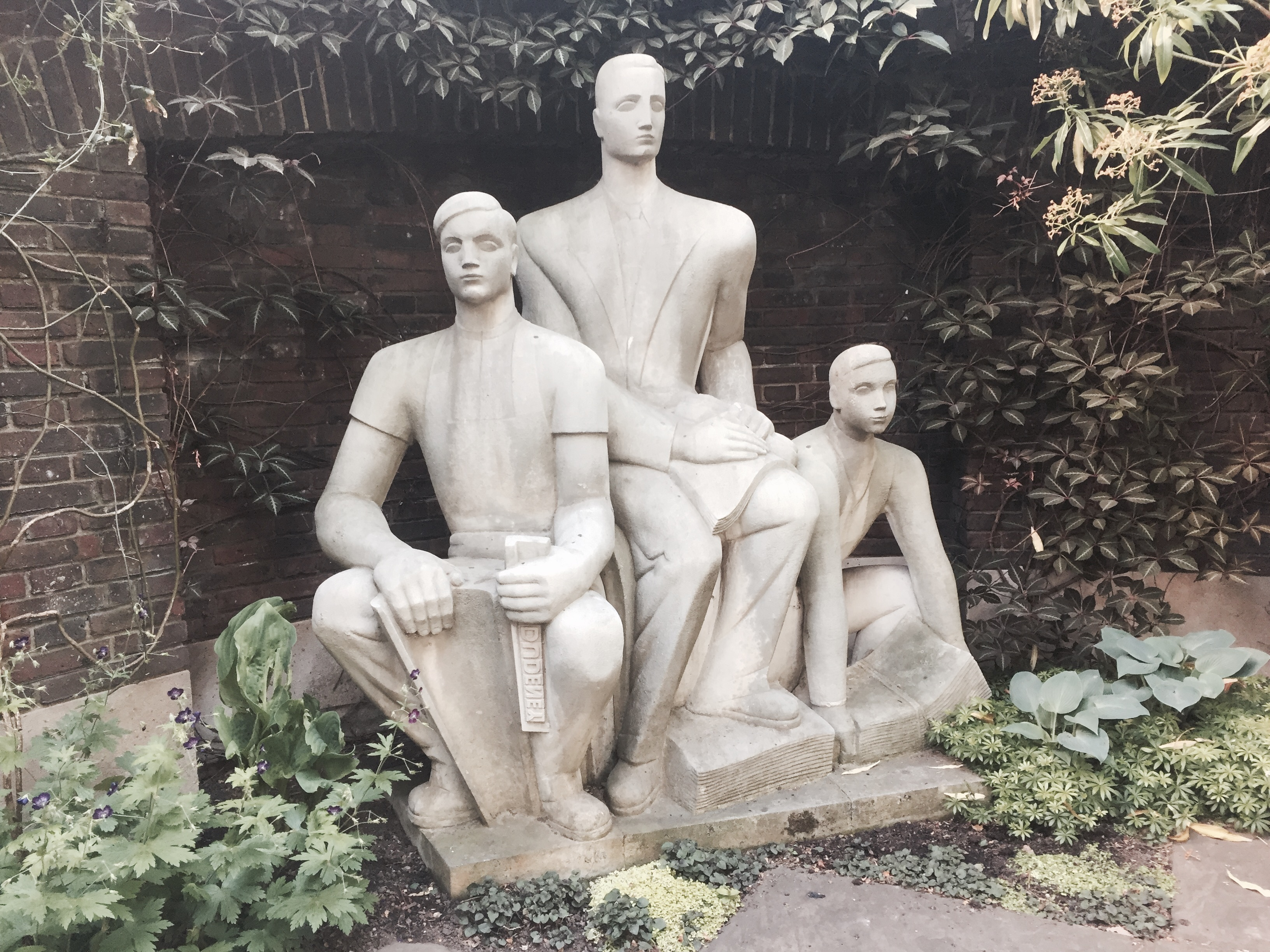
The Three Printers sculpture in its new location in 2017

Wilson was instrumental in the rescue of the only public monument to journalism, Three Printers by Wilfred Dudeney (1911–1989). Originally sited in New Street Square behind Fleet Street, the sculpture disappeared during the square's 2005 redevelopment and was destined for a builder's crusher until his intervention. It is now re-sited in the public gardens of the Goldsmiths' Company in Gresham Street, London EC2.

== Publications ==
(As TP Fielden)

- Betraying The Crown - published by Thomas & Mercer, 2022
- Burying The Crown - .published by Thomas & Mercer, 2021
- Stealing The Crown - published by Thomas & Mercer, 2020
- Died And Gone To Devon - published by HQ/HarperCollins, 2019
- A Quarter Past Dead - published by HQ/HarperCollins, 2018
- Resort To Murder - published by HarperCollins, 2018
- The Riviera Express - published by HarperCollins, 2017

*

(As Christopher Wilson)

- The Riviera Express (as TP Fielden). Published by HarperCollins/HQ, 2017
- Dancing with the Devil: The Windsors and Jimmy Donahue, by Christopher Wilson. Published by HarperCollins/St Martin's Griffin, 2002
- The Windsor Knot: Charles, Camilla, and the Legacy of Diana, by Christopher Wilson. Published by Pinnacle, 2002
- Around the World in 80 Years, by Christopher Wilson and Arne Larsson. Published by Ankroon Publishing, 2002
- Absolutely… Goldie, by Christopher Wilson. Published by HarperCollins Entertainment, 1999
- A Greater Love, by Christopher Wilson. Published by Headline/William Morrow & Co, 1994
- Diana v Charles, by Christopher Wilson and James Whitaker. Published by Viking, 1993/Greymalkin 2018
- By Invitation Only, by Christopher Wilson and Richard Young. Published by Quartet Books, 1981
