= Arne Larsson (patient) =

Swedish, first person worldwide with a cardiac pacemaker implant

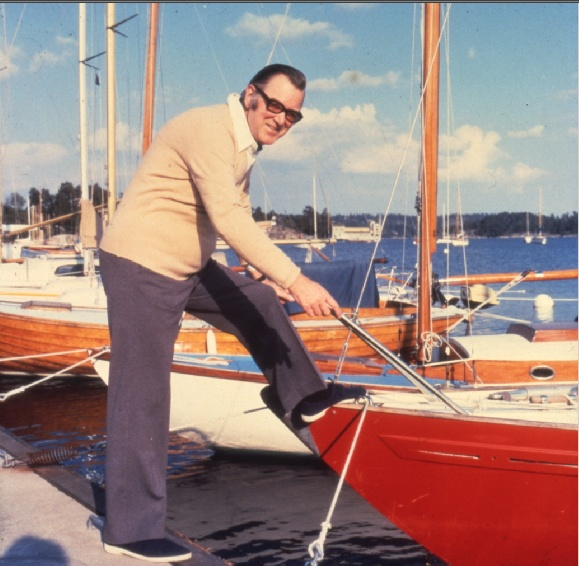
- Arne Larsson tying a boat to a dock.
- Born: Arne Larsson; 26 May 1915; Skultuna, Sweden
- Died: 28 December 2001 (aged 86); Nacka, Sweden
- Known for: The first patient who depended on an artificial cardiac pacemaker

Arne Larsson (26 May 1915 – 28 December 2001) was the first patient to receive an artificial cardiac pacemaker. The first two pacemakers were implanted by Åke Senning in 1958. Arne lived for another forty-three years and during that time went through twenty-six pacemakers.

He died from melanoma on 28 December 2001 after being diagnosed two years prior.
