= Manny Villafaña =

American businessman (born 1940)

Manny Villafana
- Born: 1940 (age 85–86); New York City, New York, U.S.
- Occupations: Founder, chairman and CEO, Medical 21 founder, chairman and CEO, Kips Bay Medical; founder, St. Jude Medical; founder, chairman and president, Cardiac Pacemakers Inc.

Manny Villafaña (born 1940 in New York City) is an American founder, chairman and CEO. A child of Puerto Rican immigrants, he attended Cardinal Hayes High School in the Bronx. He began his medical career in 1964 at medical-device exporter Picker International. In 1967, he was hired away from Picker by Earl Bakken, CEO of Medtronic to become their first international sales administrator.

== Business ==
In 1971 he co-founded Cardiac Pacemakers Inc.(CPI) with Anthony Adducci, Arthur Schwalm, and James Baustert, each with experience in a different aspect of the pacemaker business. All four had built their careers at Medtronic. The founding partners had multiple lawsuits by and against Medtronic, all settled out of court. CPI was a CRM company that revolutionized the pacemaker industry by introducing a long life lithium iodine pacemaker, a technology still utilized by a majority of the market.

In 1976, he founded St. Jude Medical where his team engineered the first bileaflet mechanical heart valve, which reduced the frequency of blood clots in patients. It still dominates the mechanical valve replacement market.

In 1982, Villafana founded GV Medical, which developed a device to open blood vessels open.

In 1987, he founded Helix BioCore, which eventually transformed into ATS Medical, a company that developed a bi-leaflet valve which uses an open-pivot design to reduce clots and improve blood flow.

Then in 2000, he launched CABG Medical to pursue the creation of an artificial graft for coronary bypass surgery. The company closed in 2006.

In 2007, he launched Kips Bay Medical, a medical device company that focuses on proprietary external saphenous vein support technology for use in coronary artery bypass grafting (CABG) surgery.

== Awards ==
- 2017 Bronx Walk of Fame.
- 2010 Induction into the Minnesota Science and Technology Hall of Fame
- 2006 Ellis Island Medal of Honor
- 2006 Living Legend of Medicine Award from the World Society of Cardiothoracic Surgeons
- 2003 Minnesota Business Hall of Fame
- 1998 Grand Prize Recipient - Mediterranean Institute of Cardiology
- 1993 Boys and Girls Club of America Hall of Fame
- 1990 National Entrepreneur of the Year Award in the Master category

== Speaking engagements ==
- 2009, 2011 Advances in Cardiothoracic Surgery ACTS
- 2012 International Society of Minimally Invasive Cardiothoracic Surgery ISMICS
