= Transvenous pacing =

- Other names: Endocardial pacing
- Specialty: Cardiology

Transvenous cardiac pacing (TVP), also called endocardial pacing, is a potentially life-saving intervention used primarily to correct profound bradycardia. It can be used to treat symptomatic bradycardias that do not respond to transcutaneous pacing or to drug therapy. Transvenous pacing is achieved by threading a pacing electrode through a vein into the right atrium, right ventricle, or both.

This means of pacing the heart is not as popular as other means of pacing (like transcutaneous pacing, implanted pacemaker, epicardial pacing) because it is a temporary solution to pace the heart and yet involves a similar level of risk of bleeding as a more permanent solution like placing an implanted pacemaker.

For patients who present in an emergency setting with symptomatic bradycardias, usually drugs like atropine or sympathomimetic drugs (epinephrine or dopamine) can be used to increase the heart rate to an adequate level until the underlying cause of the bradycardia can be isolated and then, possibly, a permanent pacemaker can be placed.

For patients for whom transvenous pacing is chosen, the procedure is done at the bedside with a local anesthetic alone or in conjunction with conscious sedation. The pacing electrode is advanced through the vein under fluoroscopic and electrocardiographic guidance. An X-ray after the procedure is always obtained to confirm placement of the pacing electrode.

The greater use of atropine and epinephrine or external pacing may make transvenous pacing unnecessary by stabilizing patients early in the process of caring for the patient. Some debate exists over the efficacy and reliability of transvenous pacing, especially if the need for permanent pacing is anticipated.
