= Cardiac Pacemakers, Inc. =

Medical equipment company

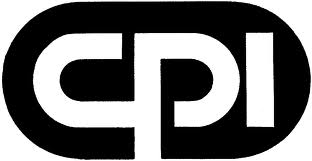
- Type: Subsidiary
- Industry: Medical equipment
- Founded: 1971
- Headquarters: Saint Paul, Minnesota, U.S.
- Products: Medical devices
- Services: Medical technology
- Parent: Boston Scientific

Cardiac Pacemakers, Inc. (CPI), doing business as Guidant Cardiac Rhythm Management, manufactured implantable cardiac rhythm management devices, such as pacemakers and defibrillators. It sold microprocessor-controlled insulin pumps and equipment to regulate heart rhythm. It developed therapies to treat irregular heartbeat. The company was founded in 1971 and is based in Saint Paul, Minnesota, and is presently a subsidiary of Boston Scientific.

== History ==
CPI was founded in February 1972 in Saint Paul, Minnesota. The first $50,000 capitalization for CPI was raised from a phone booth on the Minneapolis skyway system. They began designing and testing their implantable cardiac pacemaker powered with a new longer-life lithium battery in 1971. The first heart patient to receive a CPI pacemaker emerged from surgery in June 1973. Within two years, the upstart company that challenged Medtronic had sold approximately 8,500 pacemakers.

Medtronic at the time had 65% of the artificial pacemaker market. CPI was the first spin-off from Medtronic. It competition using the world's first lithium-powered pacemaker. Medtronic's market share plummeted to 35%.

Founding partners Anthony Adducci, Manny Villafaña, Jim Baustert, and Art Schwalm, were former Medtronic employees. Lawsuits ensued, all of which were settled out of court.

=== Eli Lilly acquisition ===
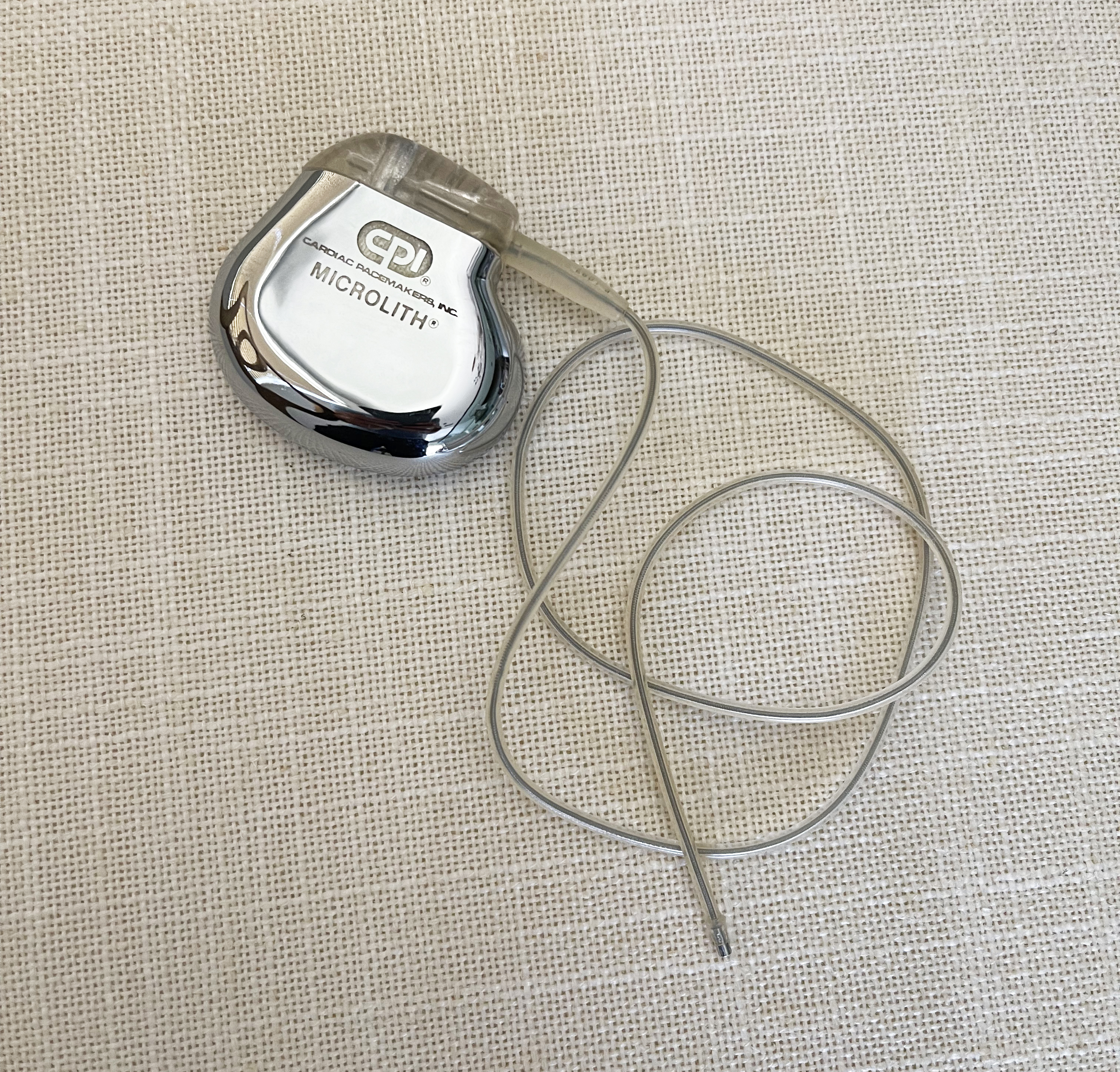
Cardiac Pacemaker's microlyth pacemaker

The company sold 8,500 pacemakers, increasing sales from zero in 1972 to over $47 million.

In early 1978, CPI was concerned about a friendly takeover attempt. Despite impressive sales, the company's stock price had fluctuated wildly the year before, dropping from $33 to $11 per share. Some speculated that the stock was being sold short, while others attributed the price to the natural volatility of high-tech stock. As a one-product company, CPI was susceptible to changing market conditions, and its founders knew they needed to diversify. They considered two options: acquiring other medical device companies or being acquired themselves. They chose the latter.

Several companies expressed interest in acquiring CPI, including 3M, American Hospital Supply, Pfizer, and Johnson & Johnson. However, Eli Lilly and Company, one of the premier pharmaceutical companies in the United States, was the most enthusiastic suitor. "Lilly had the research expertise, highly compatible interests, and similar values," Anthony Adducci recalls. "At CPI, we haven't been able to dedicate the dollars and time necessary to develop new products beyond our staple lithium-powered pacemaker. Lilly was a $2 billion company. We knew they had tremendous resources, especially in research and development." Additionally, Eli Lilly and CPI were already interested in developing insulin pumps, and Lilly was working with cardiovascular drugs, a natural link to CPI's heart pacemaker business.

Before the final negotiations in late 1978, there were numerous flights between Minneapolis and Indianapolis for CPI principals and representatives of Piper, Jaffray & Hopwood's corporate finance department. Lilly, a pharmaceutical giant, and CPI, the upstart pacemaker company, sat down at a bargaining table at a motel in suburban Bloomington, Minnesota. CPI's negotiation team included Anthony Adducci, Art Schwalm, Tom King, and Hunt Greene.

In December 1978, the company was acquired by Eli Lilly and Company for $127 million.

== Lithium battery ==
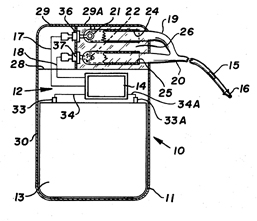
Cardiac pacemaker's lithium battery-powered pacemaker, the world's first

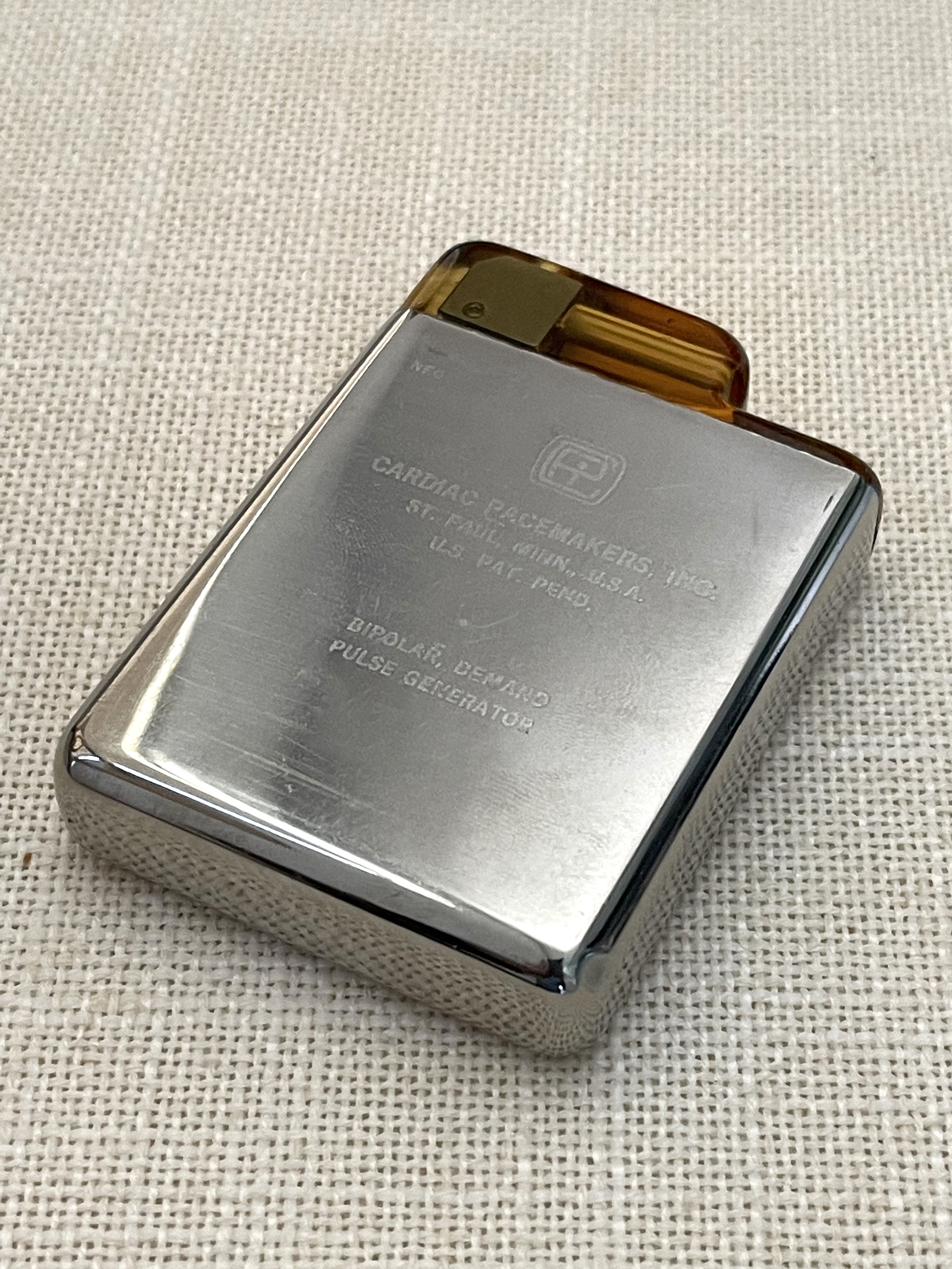
The company's lithium-iodine bipolar pulse generator

CPI designed and manufactured the world's first pacemaker with a lithium anode and a lithium-iodide electrolyte solid-state battery. The pacemaker structure is enclosed in a hermetically sealed metallic enclosure, allowing electrode leads to pass in a sealed relationship. The surface of the casing is polished metal, with a zone through which the external electrode leads pass.

The Lithium-iodide or lithium anode cells revolutionized the medical industry by increasing the pacemaker life from 1 year up to 11 years. It became the standard for pacemaker designs.
