= Woldemar Mobitz =

Russian-German physician (1889–1951)

Woldemar Mobitz (31 May 1889 – 11 April 1951) was a Russian-German physician. The forms of second degree AV block are named after him for him.

Mobitz was born on 31 May 1889 in St. Petersburg, Russia. He attended the local high school in Meiningen (Saxony, Germany) from which he graduated in 1908. He then studied medicine at the Universities of Freiburg and Munich, where he earned his doctorate in 1914 (“Contributions to Basedow disease”). He then worked at the Surgical Hospitals in Berlin and Halle as well as in internal medicine at the University Hospitals of Munich and Freiburg. In Munich, Mobitz was promoted to the position of a senior lecturer thanks to his research on heart block. In 1928, after a 4-year tenure, he accepted a post in Freiburg as Associate Professor and Chief of Staff of the Clinic of Internal Medicine. In 1943, he became Director of the Medical Hospital in Magdeburg-Sudenburg Municipal Hospital until the occupation by the Soviet army in 1945. Mobitz's work was devoted to internal medicine and he was especially interested in cardiology. From 1924 to 1928, he published his famous key papers on AV dissociation and heart block. In 1924, Mobitz differentiated two types of second degree AV block with the aid of the electrocardiogram and characterized their prognostic significance. With type I (Mobitz type I), the PR interval increases gradually until there is a breakdown of AV conduction. This form is identical to the previously described type of second-degree AV block by Wenckebach at the end of the nineteenth century. With type II block (Mobitz type II), all conducted beats show a constant, typically normal PR interval, and conduction to the ventricles occurs at regular intervals. This form is identical to the type of AV block described by Hay in 1906 without the benefit of electrocardiography. Mobitz included 2 : 1, 3 : 1 AV block in his type II classification, and indicated the serious nature of type II block and its propensity to Adams-Stokes attacks.

The Woldemar-Mobitz-Forschungspreis for works concerning rhythmology is awarded by the Deutsche Gesellschaft für Kardiologie.

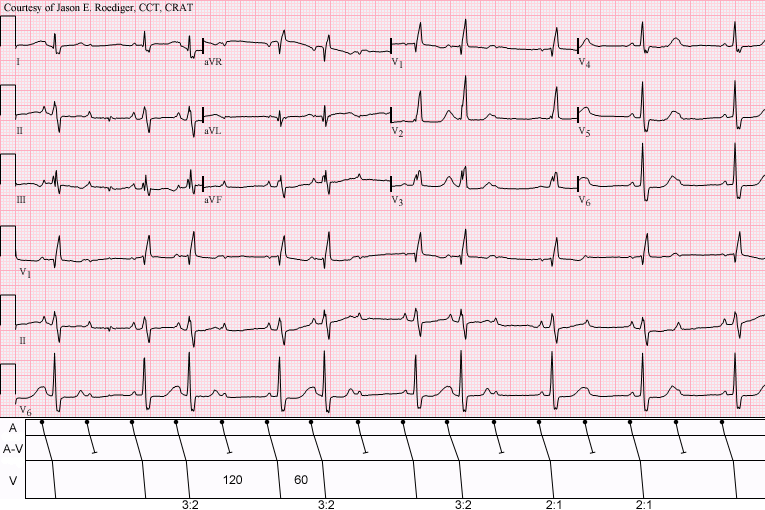
Sinus rhythm (rate = 100/min) with 3:2 and 2:1 Type II A-V block; RBBB
