= Bradycardia =

Heart rate below the normal range

- Other names: Bradyarrhythmia, brachycardia
- Sinus bradycardia seen in lead II with a heart rate of about 50 BPM
- Pronunciation: /ˌbrædɪˈkɑːrdiə/
- Specialty: Cardiology
- Diagnostic method: electrocardiogram
- Frequency: 15% (males), 7% (females)

Bradycardia (from Ancient Greek βραδύς (bradús) 'slow' and καρδία (kardía) 'heart'), also called bradyarrhythmia, is a resting heart rate of fewer than 60 beats per minute (BPM). While bradycardia can result from various pathological processes, it is commonly a physiological response to cardiovascular conditioning or due to asymptomatic type 1 atrioventricular block.

Resting heart rates of fewer than 50 BPM are often normal during sleep in young and healthy adults and athletes. In large population studies of adults without underlying heart disease, resting heart rates of 45–50 BPM appear to be the lower limits of normal, dependent on age and sex. Bradycardia is most likely to be discovered in the elderly, as age and underlying cardiac disease progression contribute to its development.

Bradycardia may be associated with symptoms of fatigue, dyspnea, dizziness, confusion, and syncope due to reduced blood flow to the brain. The types of symptoms often depend on the etiology of the slow heart rate, classified by the anatomical location of a dysfunction within the cardiac conduction system. Generally, these classifications involve the broad categories of sinus node dysfunction (SND), atrioventricular block, and other conduction tissue diseases. However, bradycardia can also result without dysfunction of the conduction system, arising secondarily to medications, including beta blockers, calcium channel blockers, antiarrythmics, and other cholinergic drugs. Excess vagus nerve activity or carotid sinus hypersensitivity are neurological causes of transient symptomatic bradycardia. Hypothyroidism and metabolic derangements are other common extrinsic causes of bradycardia.

The management of bradycardia is generally reserved for people with symptoms, regardless of minimum heart rate during sleep or the presence of concomitant heart rhythm abnormalities (See: Sinus pause), which are common with this condition. Untreated sinus node dysfunction increases the risk of heart failure and syncope, sometimes warranting definitive treatment with an implanted pacemaker. In atrioventricular causes of bradycardia, permanent pacemaker implantation is often required when no reversible causes of disease are found. In both SND and atrioventricular blocks, there is little role for medical therapy unless a person is hemodynamically unstable, which may require the use of medications such as atropine and isoproterenol and interventions such as transcutaneous pacing until such time that an appropriate workup can be undertaken and long-term treatment selected. While asymptomatic bradycardias rarely require treatment, consultation with a physician is recommended, especially in the elderly.

The term "relative bradycardia" can refer to a heart rate lower than expected in a particular disease state, often a febrile illness. Chronotropic incompetence (CI) refers to an inadequate rise in heart rate during periods of increased demand, often due to exercise, and is an important sign of SND and an indication for pacemaker implantation.

== Normal cardiac conduction ==
The heart is a specialized muscle containing repeating units of cardiomyocytes, or heart muscle cells. Like most cells, cardiomyocytes maintain a highly regulated negative voltage at rest and are capable of propagating action potentials, much like neurons. While at rest, the negative cellular voltage of a cardiomyocyte can be raised above a certain threshold (so-called depolarization) by an incoming action potential, causing the myocyte to contract. When these contractions occur in a coordinated fashion, the atria and ventricles of the heart will pump, delivering blood to the rest of the body.

Normally, the origination of the action potential causing cardiomyocyte contraction originates from the sinoatrial node (SA node). This collection of specialized conduction tissue is located in the right atrium, near the entrance of the superior vena cava. The SA node contains pacemaker cells that demonstrate "automaticity" and can generate impulses that travel through the heart and create a steady heartbeat.

At the beginning of the cardiac cycle, the SA node generates an electrical action potential that spreads across the right and left atria, causing the atrial contraction of the cardiac cycle. This electrical impulse carries on to the atrioventricular node (AV node), another specialized grouping of cells located in the base of the right atrium, which is the only anatomically normal electrical connection between the atria and ventricles. Impulses coursing through the AV node are slowed before carrying on to the ventricles, allowing for appropriate filling of the ventricles before contraction. The SA and AV nodes are both closely regulated by the autonomic nervous system's fibres, allowing for adjustment of cardiac output by the central nervous system in times of increased metabolic demand.

Following slowed conduction through the atrioventricular node, the action potential produced initially at the SA node now flows through the His-Purkinje system. The bundle of His originates in the AV node and rapidly splits into a left and right branch, each destined for a different ventricle. Finally, these bundle branches terminate in the small Purkinje fibers that innervate myocardial tissue. The His-Purkinje system conducts action potentials much faster than can be propagated between myocardial cells, allowing the entire ventricular myocardium to contract in less time, improving pump function.

== Classification ==
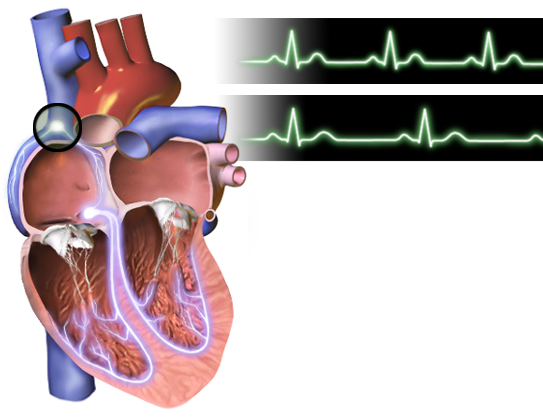
Illustration comparing the ECGs of a healthy person (top) and a person with bradycardia (bottom): The points on the heart where the ECG signals are measured are also shown.

Most pathological causes of bradycardia result from damage to this normal cardiac conduction system at various levels: the sinoatrial node, the atrioventricular node, or damage to conduction tissue between or after these nodes.

=== Sinus node ===
Bradycardia caused by the alterations of sinus node activity is divided into three types.

==== Sinus bradycardia ====
Sinus bradycardia is a sinus rhythm of fewer than 50 BPM. Cardiac action potentials are generated from the SA node and propagated through an otherwise normal conduction system, but they occur at a slow rate. It is a common condition found in both healthy individuals and those considered well-conditioned athletes. Studies have found that 50–85% of conditioned athletes have benign sinus bradycardia, as compared to 23% of the general population studied. The heart muscle of athletes has a higher stroke volume, requiring fewer contractions to circulate the same volume of blood. Asymptomatic sinus bradycardia decreases in prevalence with age in middle aged adults, with an increase seen after 65.

==== Sinus arrhythmia ====
Sinus arrhythmias are heart rhythm abnormalities characterized by variations in the cardiac cycle length over 120 milliseconds (longest cycle - shortest cycle). These are the most common type of arrhythmia in the general population and usually have no significant consequences. They typically occur in the young, athletes or after administration of medications such as morphine. The types of sinus arrhythmia are separated into the respiratory and non-respiratory categories.

===== Respiratory sinus arrhythmia =====
Respiratory sinus arrhythmia refers to the physiologically normal variation in heart rate due to breathing. During inspiration, vagus nerve activity decreases, reducing parasympathetic innervation of the sinoatrial node and causing an increase in heart rate. During expiration, heart rates fall due to the converse occurring.

===== Non-respiratory sinus arrhythmia =====
Non-respiratory causes of sinus arrhythmia include sinus pause, sinus arrest, and sinoatrial exit block. Sinus pause and arrest involve slowing or arresting of automatic impulse generation from the sinus node. This can lead to asystole or cardiac arrest if ventricular escape rhythms do not create backup sources of cardiac action potentials.

Sinoatrial exit block is a similar non-respiratory phenomenon of temporarily lost sinoatrial impulses. However, in contrast to a sinus pause, the action potential is still generated at the SA node but is either unable to leave or delayed from leaving the node, preventing or delaying atrial depolarization and subsequent ventricular systole. Therefore, the length of the pause in heartbeats is usually a multiple of the P-P interval, as seen on electrocardiography. Like a sinus pause, a sinoatrial exit block can be symptomatic, especially with prolonged pause length.

==== Sinus node dysfunction ====
A syndrome of intrinsic disease of the sinus node, referred to as sinus node dysfunction (SND) or sick sinus syndrome (SSS), covers conditions that include symptomatic sinus bradycardia or persistent chronotropic incompetence, sinoatrial block, sinus arrest, and tachycardia-bradycardia syndrome. These conditions can be caused by damage to the native sinus node itself and are frequently accompanied by damaged AV node conduction and reduced backup pacemaker activity. The condition can also be caused by dysfunction of the autonomic nervous system that regulates the node and is commonly exacerbated by medications.

=== Atrioventricular node ===
Bradycardia can also result from the inhibition of the flow of action potentials through the atrioventricular (AV) node. While this can be normal in young people due to excessive vagus nerve tone, symptomatic bradycardia due to AV node dysfunction in older people is commonly due to structural heart disease, myocardial ischemia, or age-related fibrosis.

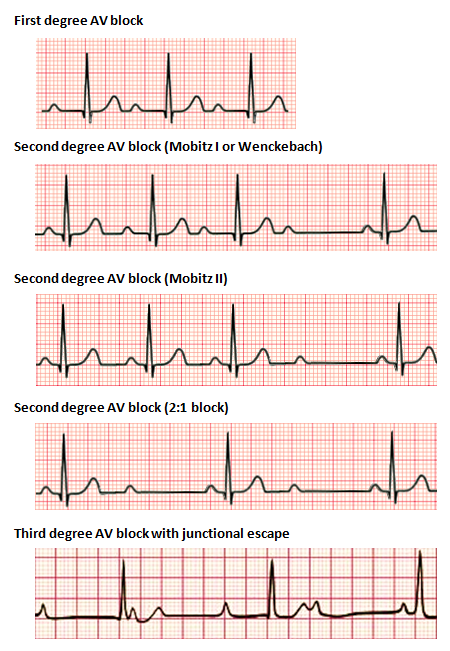
Characteristic ECGs of atrioventricular blocks, organized by degree.

==== Atrioventricular block ====
Atrioventricular blocks are divided into three categories, ranked by severity. AV block is diagnosed via surface ECG, which is usually sufficient to locate the causal lesion of the block without the need for an invasive electrophysiology study.

In 1st degree AV block, electrical impulses originating in the SA node (or other ectopic focus above the ventricles) are conducted with significant delay through the AV node. This condition is diagnosed via ECG, with PR intervals in excess of 200 milliseconds. The PR interval represents the length of time between the start of atrial depolarization and the start of ventricular depolarization, representing the flow of electrical impulses between the SA and AV nodes. Despite the term "block," no impulses are fully lost in this conduction but are merely delayed. The location of the causal lesion can be anywhere between the AV node and the His-Purkinje system but is most commonly found in the AV node itself. Generally, isolated PR prolongation in 1st degree AV block is not associated with increased mortality or hospitalization.

2nd degree AV block is characterized by intermittently lost conduction of impulses between the SA node and the ventricles. 2nd degree block is classified into two types. Mobitz type 1 block, otherwise known by the eponym Wenckebach, classically demonstrates grouped patterns of heartbeats on ECG. Throughout the group, the PR interval gradually lengthens until a dropped conduction occurs, resulting in no QRS complex seen on surface ECG following the last P wave. After a delay, the grouping repeats, with the PR interval shortening again to baseline. Type 1 2nd degree AV block due to disease in the AV node (as opposed to in the His-Purkinje system) rarely needs intervention with pacemaker implantation.

2nd degree, Mobitz type 2 AV block is another phenomenon of intermittently dropped QRS complexes after characteristic groupings of beats seen on surface ECG. The PR and RR intervals are consistent in this condition, followed by a sudden AV block and dropped QRS complex. Because type 2 blocks are typically due to lesions below the AV node, the ability for ventricular escape rhythms to maintain cardiac output is compromised. Permanent pacemaker implantation is often required.

==== Junctional rhythms ====
An AV-junctional rhythm, or atrioventricular nodal bradycardia, is usually caused by the absence of the electrical impulse from the sinus node. This usually appears on an electrocardiogram with a normal QRS complex accompanied by an inverted P wave either before, during, or after the QRS complex.

An AV-junctional escape beat is a delayed heartbeat originating from an ectopic focus somewhere in the AV junction. It occurs when the rate of depolarization of the SA node falls below the rate of the AV node. This dysrhythmia may also occur when the electrical impulses from the SA node fail to reach the AV node because of SA or AV block. This is a protective mechanism for the heart to compensate for an SA node that is no longer handling the pacemaking activity and is one of a series of backup sites that can take over pacemaker function when the SA node fails to do so. This would present with a longer PR interval. An AV-junctional escape complex is a normal response that may result from excessive vagal tone on the SA node. Pathological causes include sinus bradycardia, sinus arrest, sinus exit block, or AV block.

=== Ventricular ===
Idioventricular rhythm, also known as atrioventricular bradycardia or ventricular escape rhythm, is a heart rate of fewer than 50 BPM. This is a safety mechanism when a lack of electrical impulse or stimuli from the atrium occurs. Impulses originating within or below the bundle of His in the AV node will produce a wide QRS complex with heart rates between 20 and 40 BPM. Those above the bundle of His, also known as junctional, will typically range between 40 and 60 BPM with a narrow QRS complex. In a third-degree heart block, about 61% take place at the bundle branch-Purkinje system, 21% at the AV node, and 15% at the bundle of His. AV block may be ruled out with an ECG indicating "a 1:1 relationship between P waves and QRS complexes." Ventricular bradycardias occurs with sinus bradycardia, sinus arrest, and AV block. Treatment often consists of the administration of atropine and cardiac pacing.

=== Infantile ===
For infants, bradycardia is defined as a heart rate fewer than 100 BPM (normal is around 120–160 BPM). Premature babies are more likely than full-term babies to have apnea and bradycardia spells; their cause is not clearly understood. The spells may be related to centers inside the brain that regulate breathing which may not be fully developed. Touching the baby gently or rocking the incubator slightly will almost always get the baby to start breathing again, which increases the heart rate. The neonatal intensive-care unit standard practice is to electronically monitor the heart and lungs.

== Causes ==
Bradycardia arrhythmia may have many causes, both cardiac and non-cardiac.

Non-cardiac causes are usually secondary and can involve recreational drug use or abuse, metabolic or endocrine issues, especially hypothyroidism, an electrolyte imbalance, neurological factors, autonomic reflexes, situational factors, such as prolonged bed rest, and autoimmunity. At rest, although tachycardia is more commonly seen in fatty acid oxidation disorders, acute bradycardia can occur more rarely.

Cardiac causes include acute or chronic ischemic heart disease, vascular heart disease, valvular heart disease, or degenerative primary electrical disease. Ultimately, the causes act by three mechanisms: depressed automaticity of the heart, conduction block, or escape pacemakers and rhythms.

In general, two types of problems result in bradycardias: disorders of the SA node and disorders of the AV node.

With SA node dysfunction (sometimes called sick sinus syndrome), there may be disordered automaticity or impaired conduction of the impulse from the SA node into the surrounding atrial tissue (an "exit block"). Second-degree sinoatrial blocks can be detected only by use of a 12-lead ECG. It is difficult and sometimes impossible to assign a mechanism to any particular bradycardia, but the underlying mechanism is not clinically relevant to treatment, which is the same in both cases of sick sinus syndrome: a permanent pacemaker.

AV conduction disturbances (AV block; primary AV block, secondary type I AV block, secondary type II AV block, tertiary AV block) may result from impaired conduction in the AV node or anywhere below it, such as in the bundle of His. The clinical relevance pertaining to AV blocks is greater than that of SA blocks.

A variety of medications can induce or exacerbate bradycardia. These include beta blockers such as propranolol, calcium channel blockers such as verapamil and diltiazem, cardiac glycosides such as digoxin, alpha-2 agonists such as clonidine, and lithium, among others. Beta blockers may slow the heart rate to a dangerous level if prescribed with calcium channel blockers.

Chronic cocaine use has been associated with bradycardia. Desensitization of β-adrenergic receptors has been suggested as a possible cause of this. In contrast to cocaine however, methamphetamine has not been associated with bradyarrhythmias.

Bradycardia is also part of the mammalian diving reflex.

COVID-19 has been found to be a cause of bradycardia.

== Diagnosis ==
A diagnosis of bradycardia in adults is based on a heart rate of fewer than 60 BPM, although some studies use a heart rate of fewer than 50 BPM. This is usually determined either by palpation or ECG.

Many healthy young adults, and particularly well-trained athletes, have sinus bradycardia that is without symptoms. This can include heart rates of fewer than 50 or 60 bpm or even fewer than 40 bpm. Such individuals, without symptoms, do not require treatment.

Temporal correlation of symptoms with bradycardia is necessary for diagnosis of symptomatic bradycardia. This can sometimes be difficult. Challenge with oral theophylline can be used as a diagnostic agent in people with bradycardia caused by sinus node dysfunction to help correlate symptoms. Theophylline increases resting heart rate and improves subjective symptoms in most people with bradycardia due to SND. Blood tests, including measuring electrolyte levels, may help determine the underlying cause.

== Management ==
The treatment of bradycardia depends on whether the person is stable or unstable.

=== Chronic or stable ===
Emergency treatment is not needed if the person is asymptomatic or minimally symptomatic.

Treatment of chronic symptomatic bradycardia first necessitates correlation of symptoms. Once symptoms have been clearly linked to bradycardia, permanent cardiac pacing can be provided to increase heart rate and symptoms will improve.

In people who are unwilling to undergo pacemaker implantation or are not candidates for cardiac pacing, chronic oral theophylline, an adenosine receptor antagonist, can be considered for treatment of symptomatic bradycardia. Other positive chronotropes have also been used to treat bradycardia, including the vasodilator and antihypertensive agent hydralazine, the alpha-1 blocker prazosin, anticholinergics, and sympathomimetic agents such as beta-1 agonists. However, side effects, such as orthostatic hypotension with hydralazine, prazosin, and anticholinergics and myocardial toxicity with sympathomimetics, as well as limited data for this indication, hinder their routine and long-term use.

If hypothyroidism is present and is the cause of symptomatic bradycardia, symptoms respond well to replacement therapy with thyroid hormone.

Discontinuation of medications that induce or exacerbate bradycardia, such as beta blockers, calcium channel blockers, sodium channel blockers, and potassium channel blockers, can improve symptoms. If discontinuation of these medications is not possible due to clinical need, cardiac pacing can be considered with continuation of the medications. Beta blockers with intrinsic sympathomimetic activity (i.e., partial agonist activity), such as pindolol, have less risk of bradycardia and may be useful as replacements of pure beta blockers, such as propranolol, atenolol, and metoprolol.

=== Acute or unstable ===
If a person is unstable, the initial recommended treatment is intravenous atropine. Doses less than 0.5 mg should not be used, which may further decrease the rate. If this is ineffective, intravenous inotrope infusion (dopamine, epinephrine) or transcutaneous pacing should be used. Transvenous pacing may be required if the cause of the bradycardia is not rapidly reversible. Methylxanthines such as theophylline and aminophylline are also used in the treatment of acute bradycardia due to sinus node dysfunction.

In children, giving oxygen, supporting their breathing, and chest compressions are recommended.

== Epidemiology ==
In clinical practice, elderly people over age 65 and young athletes of both sexes may have sinus bradycardia. The US Centers for Disease Control and Prevention reported in 2011 that 15.2% of adult males and 6.9% of adult females had clinically defined bradycardia (a resting pulse rate below 60 BPM).

== Society and culture ==
=== Records ===
- Daniel Green holds the world record for the slowest heartbeat in a healthy human, with a heart rate measured in 2014 of 26 BPM.
- Martin Brady holds the Guinness world record for the slowest heart rate, with a certified rate over a minute duration of 27 BPM.
- During his career, professional cyclist Miguel Indurain had a resting heart rate of 28 BPM.

== See also ==
- Bezold–Jarisch reflex – Decrease in heart rate, breathing, and blood pressure due to chemical stimuli
- Tachycardia, increased heart rate
