= List of side effects of digoxin =

Digoxin is a widely used medication that is effective for many cardiac conditions in adults and children. Some side effects are expected, some are common but serious, some are uncommon and not serious and others are rare but serious.

== Adults ==
=== Very common (>10% incidence) ===
- Fatigue
- Nausea
- Vomiting
- Loss of appetite
- Bradycardia

=== Common (1-10% incidence) ===
- Headache
- Weakness
- Blurred vision
- Yellow or green vision
- ECG changes
- Atrioventricular block
- Sinoatrial block
- Diarrhea
- Thrombocytopenia
- Electrolyte imbalances with acute digoxin toxicity
- Hypernatremia is caused by digoxin toxicity

=== Life threatening ===
- Arrhythmias

=== Rare (<0.1%) ===
- Cardiorespiratory arrest

== Children ==
Digoxin may be prescribed for a child to treat heart defects. Possible side effects in children are: dysrhythmia, nausea, vomiting, a slower-than-normal heart rate and anorexia. Children may demonstrate side effects if they are breastfed. Digoxin is also absorbed by the infant in utero.

== Geriatric considerations ==
Kidney function gradually decreases as someone ages. The elderly are also likely to be underweight. In addition, these older people tend to be dehydrated and be taking other medications. These factors increase the likelihood of developing side effects of digoxin and digoxin toxicity. Often lowering the dose is considered by the prescriber.

== Toxicity ==
The side effects related to toxicity are used to assess the therapeutic range in a person. In toxicity, the usual supportive measures are provided. If arrhythmias prove troublesome, or malignant hyperkalaemia occurs (inexorably rising potassium level due to paralysis of the cell membrane-bound, ATPase-dependent Na/K pumps), the specific antidote is antidigoxin (antibody fragments against digoxin, trade names Digibind and Digifab). Digoxin is not removed by hemodialysis or peritoneal dialysis with enough effectiveness to treat toxicity.

== Side effects due to other drug interactions ==
Side effects can become more pronounced due to the drug interactions between digoxin and the following: Thiazide and loop diuretics, piperacillin, ticarcillin, amphotericin B, corticosteroids, and excessive laxative use. Amiodarone, some benzodiazepines, cyclosporine, diphenoxylate, indomethacin, itraconazole, propafenone, quinidine, quinine, spironolactone, and verapamil may lead to toxic levels and increased incidence of side effects. Digoxin plasma concentrations may increase while on antimalarial medication hydroxychloroquine.

Patients taking digoxin should avoid taking hawthorn.

== Side effects due to dietary supplements ==
Side effects can become pronounced due to the interactions of digoxin and these substances: licorice, aloe, and St. John's wort.

== Visual disturbances ==
An unusual side effect of digoxin is a disturbance of color vision (mostly yellow and green) called xanthopsia. Vincent van Gogh's "Yellow Period" may have somehow been influenced by concurrent digitalis therapy. Other oculotoxic effects of digoxin include generalized blurry vision, as well as seeing a "halo" around each point of light. The latter effect can also be seen in van Gogh's 1889 painting The Starry Night. Evidence of van Gogh's digoxin use is supported by multiple self-portraits that include the foxglove plant, from which digoxin is obtained.

== Bibliography ==
- Henry, Norma (2016). RN nursing care of children : review module. Stilwell, KS: Assessment Technologies Institute. ISBN 9781565335714.
- Karch, Amy (2017). Focus on nursing pharmacology. Philadelphia: Wolters Kluwer. ISBN 9781496318213.
- Vallerand, April (2017). Davis's drug guide for nurses. Philadelphia: F.A. Davis Company. ISBN 9780803657052.
