= Olive Scott =

English paediatric cardiologist

Olive Scott FRCP
- Born: Sharpe; 25 June 1924; Carlisle, Cumbria
- Died: 4 March 2007 (aged 82); Harrogate
- Education: Carlisle and County High School for Girls
- Occupation: Paediatric cardiologist
- Known for: First person in Britain appointed to a consultant position in paediatric cardiology
- Medical career
- Field: Children's congenital heart defects
- Institutions: Leeds General Infirmary
- Notable works: Heart Disease in Paediatrics

Olive Scott FRCP (née Sharpe; 25 June 1924 – 4 March 2007) was an English paediatric cardiologist. She was the first person in Britain appointed to a consultant position in paediatric cardiology.

== Early life ==
Olive Sharpe was born on 25 June 1924 in Carlisle, Cumbria. She attended Carlisle and County High School for Girls and completed her medical studies at Sheffield Medical School in 1948. She later married James Scott, a reproductive immunologist.

== Career ==
Scott was a junior doctor at Liverpool, where she worked with the cardiologist John Hay and developed an interest in children's congenital heart defects. Her postgraduate research with Hay earned her a doctoral degree in 1957. She moved to Leeds after her husband was appointed professor at the University of Leeds in 1961, and began working at Leeds General Infirmary.

In 1966, Scott was appointed by Killingbeck Hospital as a consultant paediatric cardiologist; she was the first person in Britain to hold such a position. The same year, she became the first person in the UK to perform a balloon atrial septostomy after learning how to perform the procedure from its inventor, William Rashkind. In 1976, she established the first unit in a British hospital dedicated to non-invasive cardiac diagnosis through echocardiography, at Killingbeck. She also understood the importance of parents being involved in their child's medical issues and wanted them to understand information about congenital heart disease. The British Heart Foundation assisted Scott in creating a pamphlet that contained educational pictures and written information about the disease their child might have. In addition to the pamphlet, Scott introduced parents’ accommodation, so parents were able to continuously be with their child in the hospital.

Scott's most famous research work was a collaboration with her husband James Scott: they showed an association maternal anti-Ro and anti-La autoantibodies and congenital heart block in their children. Scott discovered the causative relationship between maternal lupus and babies with congenital heart blockage. She also co-authored a key textbook, Heart Disease in Paediatrics, which was first published in 1973 and was revised in three editions. She was elected Fellow of the Royal College of Physicians in 1972. On a broader level, Scott was a founding member of the Association for European Paediatric Cardiology. In her career, she trained many foreign doctors in her speciality. She was often known for her perfect English diction, and this helped her in her foreign affairs.

== Later life ==
Scott retired from medicine in 1986. She died in Harrogate on 4 March 2007.
