= Cooper-Saeed waves =

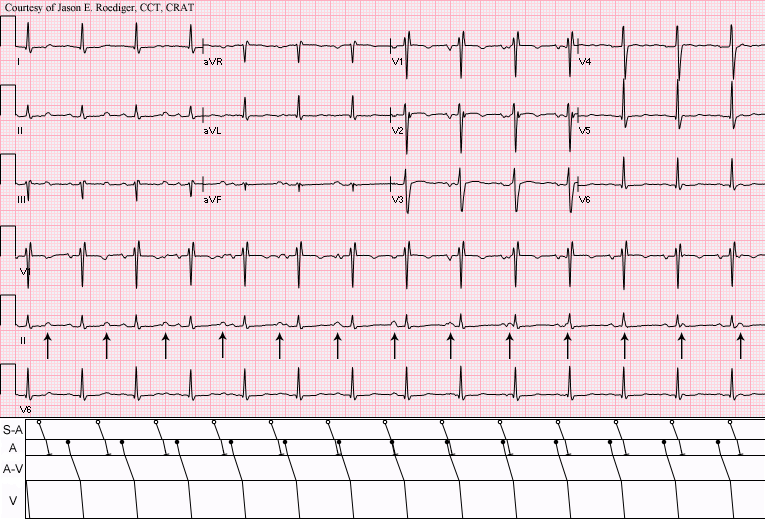
Orthotopic heart transplant. Recipient P-waves (arrows).

Cooper-Saeed waves refer to donor heart conducted P waves on the 12-lead ECG tracing of heart transplant recipients, also demonstrating non-conducted P waves of the recipient heart.
