= Luigi Luciani =

Italian neuroscientist

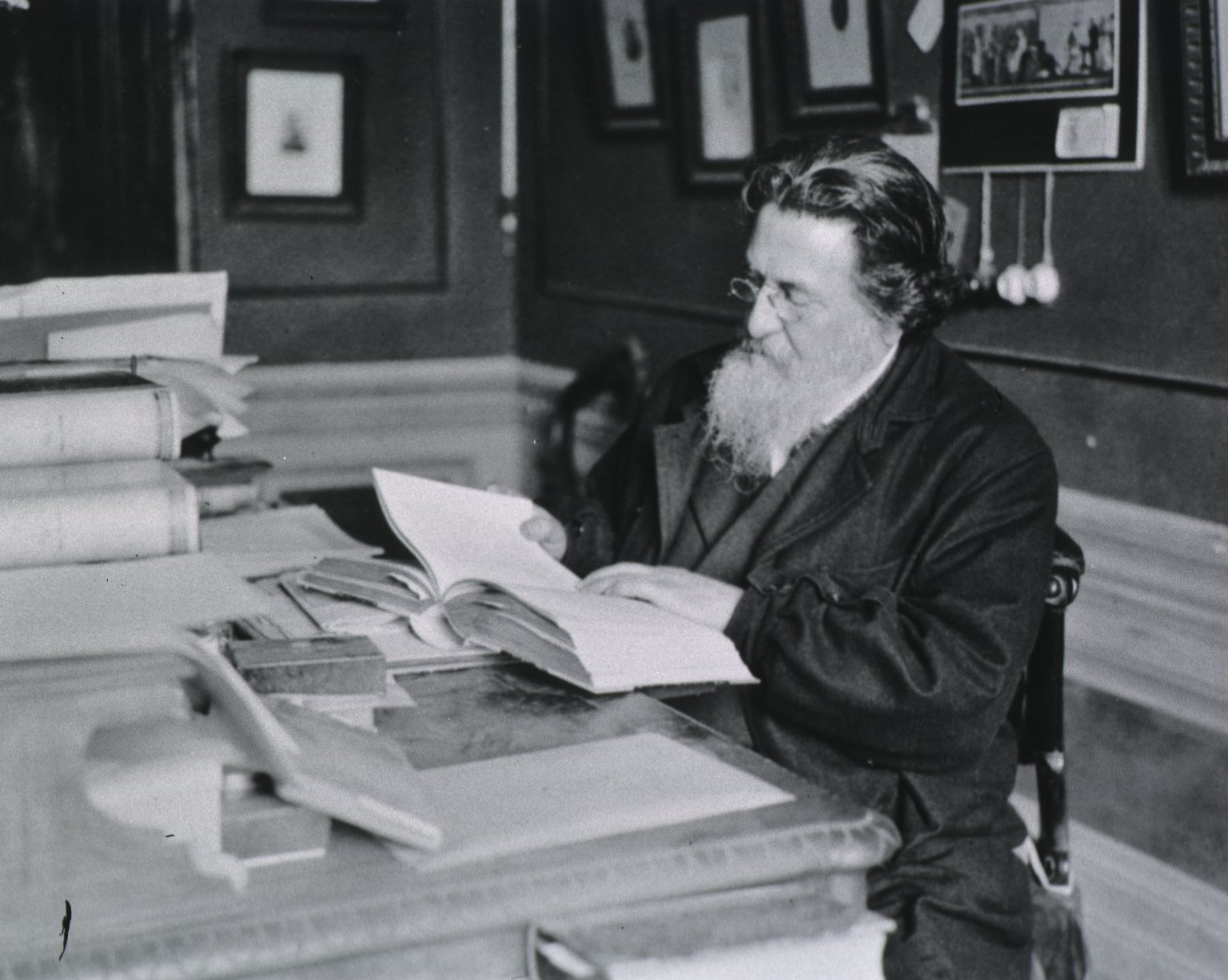
- Born: 23 November 1842
- Died: 23 June 1919 (aged 76)
- Scientific career
- Fields: Neuroscience

Luigi Luciani ForMemRS (23 November 1842, in Ascoli Piceno – 23 June 1919) was an Italian neuroscientist.[1] Luciani is particularly remembered for his experimental studies of the cerebellum and for his 1891 monograph Il cervelletto, in which he described the classic triad of cerebellar symptoms of atonia, asthenia and astasia.[3] He also contributed to Karel Frederik Wenckebach's work on what is now known as second-degree atrioventricular block of the heart in which Wenckebach described the periodicity of this block as "Luciani periodicity".[2] Beyond his work on the cerebellum, he also carried out significant research on the physiology of fasting in humans, describing changes in major organ functions during prolonged deprivation and distinguishing three stages of fasting.[4]
