= Second-degree atrioventricular block =

- Other names: Second-degree heart block
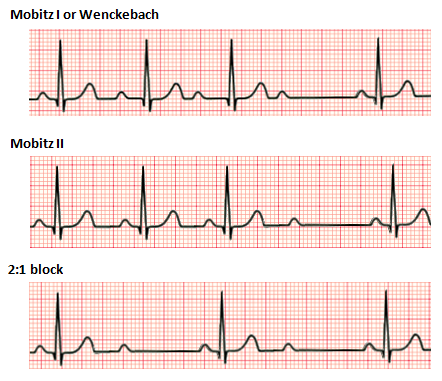
- ECGs demonstrating forms of second-degree AV block
- Specialty: Cardiology
- Symptoms: Dizziness, Fainting, Shortness of breath
- Types: Type 1 (Wenckebach), Type 2
- Causes: Fibrosis in AV node, medication, vagal tone, electrolyte disturbances
- Diagnostic method: Electrocardiogram
- Treatment: Avoidance of AV-nodal-blocking medication, pacemaker

Second-degree atrioventricular block (AV block) is a disease of the electrical conduction system of the heart. It is a conduction block between the atria and ventricles. The presence of second-degree AV block is diagnosed when one or more (but not all) of the atrial impulses fail to conduct to the ventricles due to impaired conduction. It is classified as a block of the AV node, falling between first-degree (slowed conduction) and third degree blocks (complete block).

== Signs and symptoms ==
Most people with Wenckebach (Type I Mobitz) do not show symptoms. However, those that do usually display one or more of the following:

- Light-headedness
- Dizziness
- Syncope (fainting)

== Types ==
There are two non-distinct types of second-degree AV block, called Type 1 and Type 2. In both types, a P wave is blocked from initiating a QRS complex; but, in Type 1, there are increasing delays in each cycle before the omission, whereas, in Type 2, there is no such pattern.

Type 1 second-degree heart block is considered more benign than type 2 second-degree heart block. The type 1 does not have structural changes found on histology.

Both types are named after Woldemar Mobitz. Type I is also named after Karel Frederik Wenckebach, and type II is also named after John Hay.

=== Type 1 (Mobitz I/Wenckebach) ===
Type 1 Second-degree AV block, also known as Mobitz I or Wenckebach periodicity, is almost always a disease of the AV node. Wenckebach published a paper in 1906 on progressively lengthening PR intervals that was later classified as Type I in Mobitz's 1924 paper. Thus, both "Mobitz type I" and "Wenckebach block" refer to the same pattern and pathophysiology.

In Wenckebach's 1906 paper, his original observations were of increasing delay in contraction of the atria and ventricles that shortened after a brief pause. He later observed this in the electrocardiogram (ECG) after Einthoven's 1901 invention. In modern practice, Mobitz I heart block is characterized by progressive prolongation of the PR interval on consecutive beats followed by a blocked P wave (i.e., a dropped QRS complex). After the dropped QRS complex, the PR interval resets and the cycle repeats. This grouped beating was described as "Luciani periods" after Luigi Luciani's work in 1873. The result is a lengthening of the R-R intervals as each subsequent P-wave reaches an increasingly refractory AV node until the impulse fails to conduct, which ultimately results in a blocked QRS complex. A blocked P-wave may not be present under some circumstances, such as coexisting sinoatrial block.

One of the baseline assumptions when determining if an individual has Mobitz I heart block is that the atrial rhythm has to be regular. If the atrial rhythm is not regular, there could be alternative explanations as to why certain P waves do not conduct to the ventricles.

Mobitz I heart block is almost always a benign condition for which no specific treatment is needed for the rhythm itself. It can be seen in myocardial ischemia, propranolol use, digitalis use, rheumatic fever, and chronically in ischemic heart disease and other structural diseases (amyloidosis, mitral valve prolapse, aortic valve disease, and atrial septal defect). In symptomatic cases, intravenous atropine or isoproterenol may transiently improve conduction.

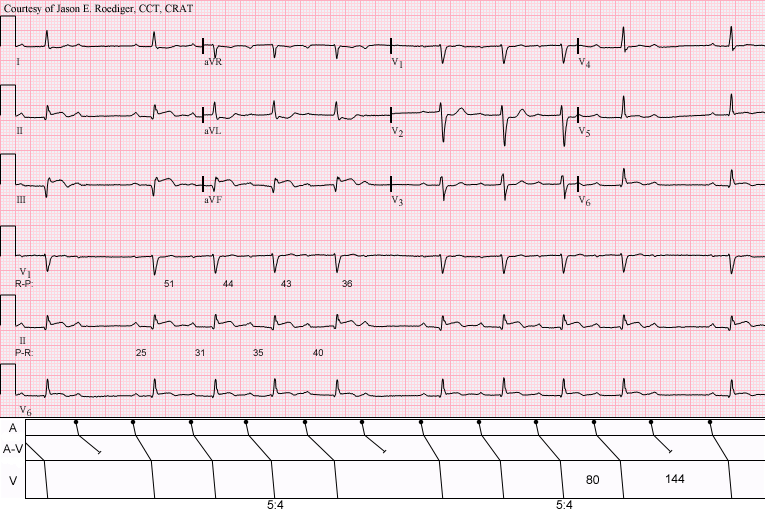
Sinus rhythm with acute inferior infarction complicated by Type I A-V block manifest in the form of 5:4 Wenckebach periods; R-P/P-R reciprocity.

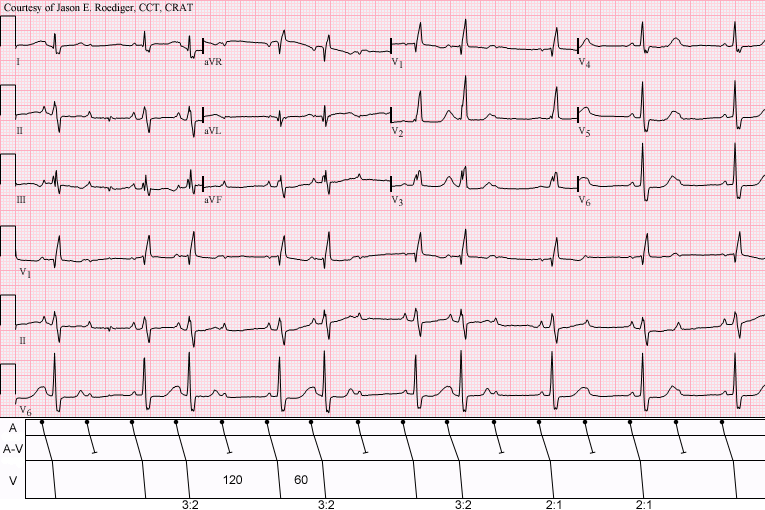
Sinus rhythm (rate = 100/min) with 3:2 and 2:1 Type II A-V block; RBBB

=== Type 2 (Mobitz II/Hay) ===
Type 2 Second-degree AV block, also known as Mobitz II, is almost always a disease of the distal conduction system (His-Purkinje System).

Mobitz II heart block is characterized on a surface ECG by intermittently non-conducted P waves not preceded by PR prolongation and not followed by PR shortening. There is usually a fixed number of non-conducted P waves for every successfully conducted QRS complex, and this ratio is often specified in describing Mobitz II blocks. For example, Mobitz II block in which there are two P waves for every one QRS complex may be referred to as 2:1 Mobitz II block.^{:181}

The medical significance of this type of AV block is that it may progress rapidly to complete heart block, in which no escape rhythm may emerge. In this case, the person may experience a Stokes-Adams attack, cardiac arrest, or sudden cardiac death. The definitive treatment for this form of AV Block is an implanted pacemaker.

The impairment is usually below the AV node. Although the terms infranodal block or infrahisian block are often applied to this disorder, they refer to the anatomic location of the block, whereas Mobitz II refers to an electrocardiographic pattern.

=== P:QRS ratios ===
Because type I Mobitz block occurs in regular cycles, there is always a fixed ratio between the number of P waves and the number of QRS complexes per cycle. This ratio is often specified when describing the block. For example, a Mobitz type I block which has 4 P waves and 3 QRS complexes per cycle may be referred to as 4:3 Mobitz Type I block.^{:179}

Type II Mobitz block also usually occurs with a fixed P:QRS ratio, with a set number of P waves for every successfully elicited QRS.^{:179} This ratio is also frequently specified in referring to 3:1, 4:1, 5:1, or higher Mobitz type II block. Higher numbers of P waves for every QRS indicate more severe block^{:181} and ratios of 3:1 and above are also referred to as "High Grade" AV Block^{e60}. Of course, because type II Mobitz block is unstable by nature, it is common for the P:QRS ratio in Mobitz type II block to change over time.

The P:QRS ratio is always of the form X:(X − 1) in type I Mobitz block.

=== 2:1 AV block ===
In the case of 2:1 block (2 P waves for every QRS complex) it is impossible to differentiate type I from type II Mobitz block-based solely on the P:QRS ratio or on a pattern of lengthening PR intervals.^{:182} In this case, a lengthened PR interval with a normal QRS width is most likely indicative of a type I-like pathology, and a normal PR interval with a widened QRS is most likely indicative of a type II-like pathology.^{:182}

== See also ==
- Electrocardiogram (ECG or EKG)
- SA node
- AV node
- Atrioventricular block
- First-degree AV block
- Third-degree AV block
