= James Scott (obstetrician) =

Scottish obstetrician and gynecologist

James Steel Scott (18 April 1924 – 17 September 2006) was a Scottish obstetrician and gynaecologist who was a pioneer in the field of reproductive immunology. He was Professor of Obstetrics and Gynaecology at the University of Leeds from 1961 to 1989.

== Early life ==
James Scott was born in Glasgow on 18 April 1924. His father, Angus McAlpine Scott, was a physician and surgeon. After an education at the Glasgow Academy and the University of Glasgow Medical School, qualifying in 1946, he completed two years of national service with the Royal Army Medical Corps in West Africa.

== Career ==
At the completion of his national service in 1949, Scott returned to Britain to train in obstetrics and gynaecology, first at Queen Charlotte's Hospital in London and then at Birmingham. In 1954, he moved to the University of Liverpool, where he met his wife Olive Sharpe, who would become a pioneering paediatric cardiologist. It was at Liverpool that Scott developed an interest in immunology; here he met Cyril Clarke and Ronald Finn, who discovered that rhesus disease in newborns could be prevented by giving anti-D immunoglobulin to pregnant mothers. Scott's own research as a senior lecturer in obstetrics at Liverpool focused on placental abnormalities and functions, pain relief in obstetrics, and resuscitation of newborn babies.

In 1961, at the age of 37, Scott was appointed Professor of Obstetrics and Gynaecology at the University of Leeds. At Leeds he continued to focus on reproductive immunology and was among the first to demonstrate that certain transient diseases in newborns were caused by the passage of antibodies from the mother to the foetus via the placenta. He showed that this was the case in neonatal hyperthyroidism, thrombocytopenia, and systemic lupus erythematosus. In a collaboration with his wife Olive, he also showed that anti-Ro antibodies, when crossing the placenta, could cause heart block in the foetus. Scott also tried to identify a cause for pre-eclampsia, a popular question for obstetric researchers at the time. He hypothesised that it was caused by an immunological mismatch between mother and foetus and although he found supportive anecdotal evidence for this theory, he was unable to prove it. While investigating whether antiphospholipid antibodies could cause pre-eclampsia, Scott discovered that these antibodies increase the risk of recurrent miscarriage; screening for these antibodies is now routine in women with recurrent miscarriage.

Scott served as dean of the Leeds School of Medicine from 1986 until his retirement in 1989.

== Death ==
Scott died from prostate cancer on 17 September 2006 in Harrogate, North Yorkshire.
