= Adams–Stokes syndrome =

Stokes-Adams syndrome
- Other names: Adams–Stokes syndrome, Gerbezius–Morgagni–Adams–Stokes syndrome, Gerbec–Morgagni–Adams–Stokes syndrome and GMAS syndrome
- Specialty: Cardiology

Adams–Stokes syndrome, Stokes–Adams syndrome, Gerbec–Morgagni–Adams–Stokes syndrome or GMAS syndrome is a periodic fainting spell in which there is intermittent complete heart block or other high-grade arrhythmia that results in loss of spontaneous circulation and inadequate blood flow to the brain. Subsequently, named after two Irish physicians, Robert Adams (1791–1875) and William Stokes (1804–1877), the first description of the syndrome is believed to have been published in 1717 by the Carniolan physician of Slovene descent Marko Gerbec. It is characterized by an abrupt decrease in cardiac output and loss of consciousness due to a transient arrhythmia; for example, bradycardia due to complete heart block.

== Signs and symptoms ==
Typically an attack occurs without warning, leading to sudden loss of consciousness. Prior to an attack, a patient may be pale with hypoperfusion. Abnormal movements may be present, typically consisting of twitching after 15–20 seconds of unconsciousness. (These movements, which are not seizures, occur because of brainstem hypoxia and not due to cortical discharge as is the case for epileptiform seizures). Breathing typically continues normally throughout the attack, and, upon recovery, the patient becomes flushed as the heart rapidly pumps the oxygenated blood from the pulmonary beds into the systemic circulation, which has become dilated due to hypoxia.

As with any syncopal episode that results from a cardiac dysrhythmia, the fainting does not depend on the patient's position. If it occurs during sleep, the presenting symptom may simply be feeling hot and flushed on waking.

== Causes ==
The attacks are caused by any temporary lack of cardiac output caused by a transient abnormal heart rhythm. Paroxysmal supraventricular tachycardia or atrial fibrillation has been reported as the underlying cause in up to 5% of patients in one series. The resulting lack of blood flow to the brain is responsible for the loss of consciousness and associated fainting episode.

== Diagnosis ==
Stokes–Adams attacks may be diagnosed from the history, with paleness prior to the attack and flushing after it particularly characteristic. The ECG will show complete heart block, high grade AV block, or other malignant arrhythmia during the attacks. Torsades de Pointes can occur in a heart block setting.

== Treatment ==
Initial treatment can be medical, involving the use of drugs like isoprenaline (Europe) or isoproterenol (US/Canada) (Isuprel) and epinephrine (adrenaline). Temporary cardiac pacing may also be used in a closely monitored setting. However, definitive treatment includes the insertion of a permanent cardiac pacemaker.
