= Q wave =

Q wave or Q-wave may refer to:

- Love wave in elastodynamics
- the Q segment of the QRS complex in electrocardiography
