= Atrioventricular block =

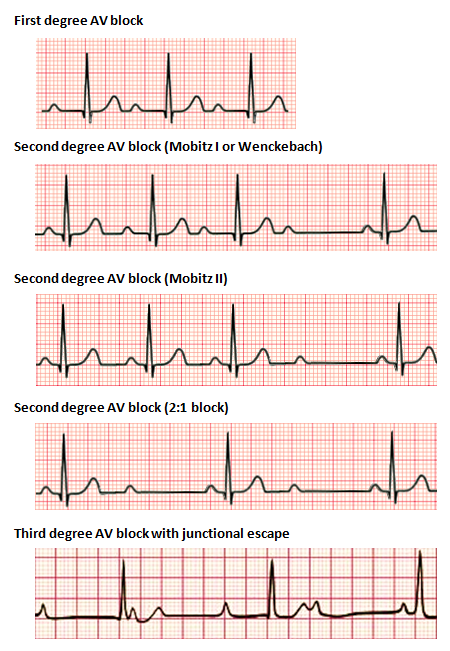
- Representative electrocardiogram recordings of the different degrees of heart block
- Specialty: Cardiology

Atrioventricular block (AV block) is a type of heart block that occurs when the electrical signal traveling from the atria, or the upper chambers of the heart, to ventricles, or the lower chambers of the heart, is impaired. Normally, the sinoatrial node (SA node) produces an electrical signal to control the heart rate. The signal travels from the SA node to the ventricles through the atrioventricular node (AV node). In an AV block, this electrical signal is either delayed or completely blocked. When the signal is completely blocked, the ventricles produce their own electrical signal to control the heart rate. The heart rate produced by the ventricles is much slower than that produced by the SA node.

Some AV blocks are benign, or normal, in certain people, such as in athletes or children. Other blocks are pathologic, or abnormal, and have several causes, including ischemia, infarction, fibrosis, and drugs.

== Classification ==
There are three types, or degrees, of AV block: (1) first-degree, (2) second-degree, and (3) third-degree, with third-degree being the most severe. An ECG is used to differentiate between the different types of AV blocks. However, one important consideration when diagnosing AV blocks from ECGs is the possibility of pseudo- AV blocks which are due to concealed junctional extrasystoles. It is important to diagnose AV-blocks precisely because unnecessary pacemaker placement in patients with pseudo-AV blocks can worsen symptoms and create complications.

=== First-degree atrioventricular block ===
First-degree AV block occurs when there is a delay, but not disruption, as the electrical signal moves between the atrium and the ventricles through the AV node. On ECG, this is defined by a PR interval greater than 200 msec. Additionally, there are no dropped, or skipped, beats.

=== Second-degree atrioventricular block ===
Second-degree AV block occurs when the electrical signal between the atria and ventricles is even more impaired than in a first-degree AV block. In a second-degree AV block, the impairment results in a failure to conduct an impulse, which causes a skipped beat.

==== Mobitz I ====
Mobitz I is characterized by a progressive yet reversible block of the AV node. On ECG, this is defined by progressive prolongation of the PR interval, with a resulting dropped beat (the PR interval gets longer and longer until a beat is finally dropped, or skipped).

Some patients are asymptomatic; those who have symptoms respond to treatment effectively. There is a low risk of a Mobitz I AV block leading to complete heart block or cardiac arrest.

==== Mobitz II ====
Mobitz II is caused by a sudden, unexpected failure of the His-Purkinje cells to conduct the electrical impulse. On ECG, the PR interval is unchanged from beat to beat, but there is a sudden failure to conduct the signal to the ventricles, and resulting in random skipped beat.

The risks and possible effects of Mobitz II are much more severe than Mobitz I in that the risk of progression to complete heart block or asystole are significant.

=== Third-degree atrioventricular block ===
Third-degree AV block occurs when the signal between the atria and ventricles is completely blocked, and there is no communication between the two. None of the signals from the upper chambers make it to the lower chambers. On ECG, there is no relationship between P waves and QRS complexes, meaning the P waves and QRS complexes are not in a 1:1 ratio.

Third-degree AV block is the most severe of the AV blocks. Persons with third-degree AV block need emergency treatment including but not limited to a pacemaker.

== Etiology ==
There are many causes of AV block, ranging from a normal variant among people to the result of a heart attack.

First-degree AV block and Mobitz I second-degree block are often thought to be just normal, benign, conditions in people, and do not often result from a severe underlying condition.

Mobitz II second-degree block and third-degree AV block are not normal variants and are associated with an underlying condition. Common causes include ischemia (lack of blood flow and oxygen to the heart muscle) or progressive fibrosis (excessive scarring) of the heart. It is also possible that a high degree block can result after cardiac surgery during which the surgeon was in close proximity to the electrical conduction system and accidentally injured it. Reversible causes of Mobitz II and third-degree heart block include untreated Lyme disease, hypothyroidism, hyperkalemia (high levels of potassium), and drug toxicity. Drugs that slow the conduction of the electrical signal through AV node, such as beta-blockers, digoxin, calcium channel blockers, and amiodarone, can cause heart block if they are taken in excessive amounts, or the levels in the blood get too high.

== Anatomy ==
Electrical conduction pathway of the heart.

Normal ECG tracing for a single contraction of the heart.

The synchronized contraction of the heart occurs through a well-coordinated electrical signal pathway. The initial electrical signal originates from the SA node located in the upper portion of the right atrium. The electrical signal then travels through both the right and left atrium and causes the two atria to contract at the same time. This simultaneous contraction results in the P wave seen in an ECG tracing.

The electrical signal then travels to the AV node located on the lower portion of the interatrial septum. At the AV node there is a delay in the electrical signal, which allows the atria to contract and blood to flow from the atria to the ventricles. This delay accounts for the ECG period between the P wave and the QRS complex, and creates the PR interval.

From the AV nodes, the electrical signal travels through Bundle of His and divides into the right bundle and left bundle, which are located within the interventricular septum. Finally, the electrical signal travels into the Purkinje fibers. The division of the signal into a right and left bundle and then into the Purkinje fibers allows for a simultaneous depolarization and contraction of the right and left ventricles. The contraction of the ventricles results in the QRS complex seen on an ECG tracing.

ECG tracing in relation to normal depolarization and contraction of the heart. Red tracing indicates pathway of electrical depolarization. Blue tracing indicates resulting ECG tracing.

After contraction, the ventricles must repolarize, or reset themselves, in order to allow for a second depolarization and contraction. The repolarization creates the T wave in the ECG tracing.

== Diagnosis ==
An electrocardiogram, or ECG, is used to differentiate between the different types of AV block. In AV block, there is a disruption between the signal traveling from the atria to the ventricles. This results in abnormalities in the PR interval, as well as the relationship between P waves and QRS complexes on the ECG tracing. If the patient is symptomatic from their suspected AV block, it is important that an ECG is also obtained while having symptoms. Physicians may also order a continuous ECG (i.e. Holter monitor or implanted cardiac monitor) to monitor the patient for symptoms and conduction abnormalities over a longer period of time, as AV blocks can be intermittent.

Because some types of AV block can be associated with underlying structural heart disease, patients may also undergo echocardiogram to look at the heart and assess the function.

Laboratory diagnosis for AV blocks include electrolyte, drug level and cardiac enzyme level tests. Based upon clinical suspicion, the physician may do lab tests to assess for reversible causes of AV block, such as hypothyroidism, rheumatologic disorders, and infections (such as Lyme disease).

== Management ==
Management is dependent upon the severity, or degree, of the blockage, the consistency of symptoms, as well as the cause of the AV block.

Patients with first-degree AV block do not have any resulting severe or life-threatening symptoms, such as symptomatic bradycardia or hypotension, and, thus, do not require treatment.

Similarly, patients with second-degree Mobitz I AV block rarely develop life-threatening symptoms, and patients who are asymptomatic do not require treatment. However, in some cases, patients with Mobitz I block can develop life-threatening symptoms that require intervention. These patients often respond well to atropine, but may require temporary transcutaneous pacing or transvenous pacing until they are no longer symptomatic.

Patients with second-degree Mobitz II and third-degree heart block are much more likely to have symptomatic bradycardia and hemodynamic instability, such as hypotension. Additionally, there is an increased risk of patients with Mobitz II heart block developing third-degree heart block. Therefore, these patients often require temporary pacing with transcutaneous or transvenous pacing wires, and many will ultimately require a permanent implanted pacemaker.

If the heart block is found to be caused by a reversible condition, such as Lyme disease, the underlying condition should first be treated. Often, this will lead to resolution of the heart block and the associated symptoms.
