= Sinoatrial block =

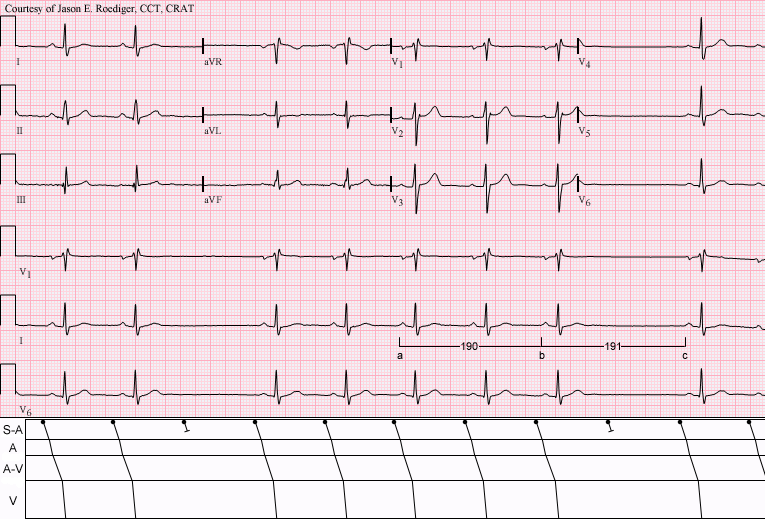
- Sinus rhythm (rate = 65/min) with Type II S-A (exit) block; (see laddergram). Note that the long cycles (191) are nearly identical to twice the short cycles (190).
- Specialty: Cardiology

A sinoatrial block (also spelled sinuatrial block) is a disorder in the normal rhythm of the heart, known as a heart block, that is initiated in the sinoatrial node. The initial action impulse in a heart is usually formed in the sinoatrial node (SA node) and carried through the atria, down the internodal atrial pathways to the atrioventricular node (AV) node. In normal conduction, the impulse would travel across the bundle of His (AV bundle), down the bundle branches, and into the Purkinje fibers. This would depolarize the ventricles and cause them to contract.

In an SA block, the electrical impulse is delayed or blocked on the way to the atria, thus delaying the atrial beat. (An AV block, occurs in the AV node and delays ventricular depolarisation). SA blocks are categorized into three classes based on the length of the delay.

== Symptoms ==
Sinoatrial blocks are typically well tolerated. They are not as serious as an AV block and most often do not require treatment. In some people, they can cause fainting, altered mental status, chest pain, hypoperfusion, and signs of shock. They can also lead to cessation of the SA node and more serious dysrhythmias.

== Types ==
In a first degree sinoatrial block, there is a lag between the time that the SA node fires and actual depolarization of the atria. This rhythm is not easily detectable using state of the art (the highest level of scientific development at the current state in time) diagnostic equipment, thus is currently not recognizable on an ECG strip because an ECG strip does not denote when the SA node fires. It can be detected only during an electrophysiology study when a small wire is placed against the SA node from within the heart and the electrical impulses can be recorded as they leave the p-cells in the centre of the node [ see pacemaker potential ], followed by observing a delay in the onset of the p wave on the ECG.

Second degree SA blocks are broken down into two subcategories just like AV blocks are:

The first is a second degree type I, or Wenckebach block. This rhythm is irregular, and the R-R interval gets progressively smaller, while the P-R interval remains constant, until a QRS segment is dropped. Note that this is quite different from the Wenckebach AV block, in which the PR interval gets progressively longer, before the dropped QRS segment. The pause of a second degree type I is less than twice the shortest R-R interval and is not a multiple of the P-R interval. The cause is a gradual lengthening of conduction time from the SA node to the atria. The p-cells in the centre of the node produce the rhythm at a regular rate, but their conduction across the node to where it meets atrial tissue is where the slowing occurs.

A second degree type II, or sinus exit block, is a regular rhythm that may be normal or slow. It is followed by a pause that is a multiple of the P-P interval usually (2-4). Conduction across the SA node is normal until the time of the pause when it is blocked.

A third degree sinoatrial block looks very similar to a sinus arrest. However, a sinus arrest is caused by a failure to form impulses. A third degree block is caused by failure to conduct them. The rhythm is irregular and either normal or slow. It is followed by a long pause that is not a multiple of the P-R interval. The pause ends with a P wave, instead of a junctional escape beat the way a sinus arrest would.

== Treatment ==
Emergency treatment consists of administration of atropine sulfate or transcutaneous pacing.
