= Third-degree atrioventricular block =

- Other names: Complete heart block
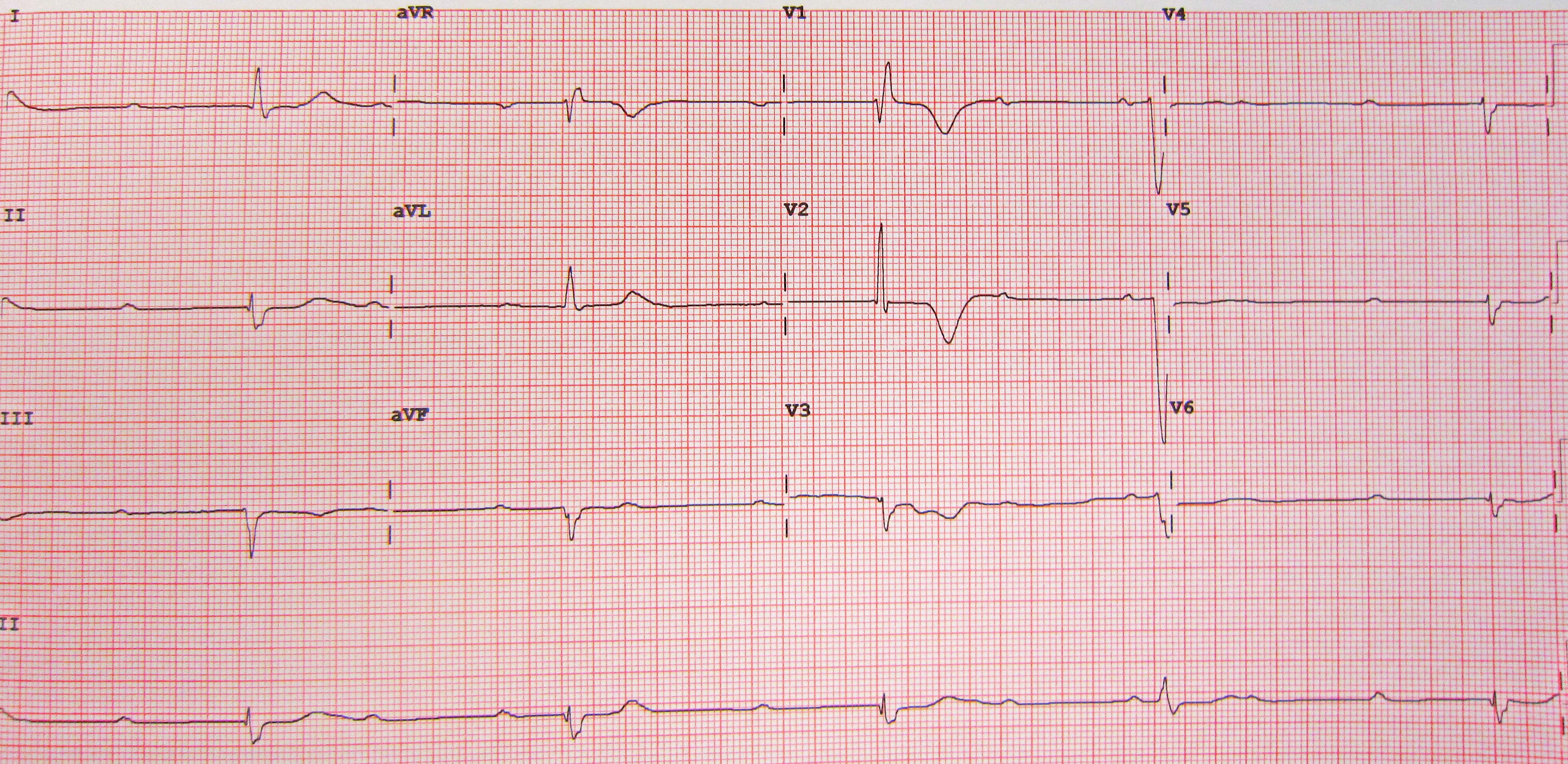
- 12-lead ECG showing complete heart block
- Specialty: Cardiology
- Symptoms: Dizziness, fainting, shortness of breath, sudden cardiac death
- Causes: Fibrosis in cardiac conduction system, myocardial infarction, post-cardiac surgery, medication, vagal tone, electrolyte disturbances
- Diagnostic method: Electrocardiogram
- Treatment: Pacemaker

Third-degree atrioventricular block (AV block) is a medical condition in which the electrical impulse generated in the sinoatrial node (SA node) in the atrium of the heart can not propagate to the ventricles.

Because the impulse is blocked, an accessory pacemaker in the lower chambers will typically activate the ventricles. This is known as an escape rhythm. Since this accessory pacemaker also activates independently of the impulse generated at the SA node, two independent rhythms can be noted on the electrocardiogram (ECG).

- The P waves with a regular P-to-P interval (in other words, a sinus rhythm) represent the first rhythm.
- The QRS complexes with a regular R-to-R interval represent the second rhythm. The PR interval will be variable, as the hallmark of complete heart block is the lack of any apparent relationship between P waves and QRS complexes.

== Presentation ==
People with third-degree AV block typically experience severe bradycardia (an abnormally low measured heart rate), hypotension, and at times, hemodynamic instability.

== Cause ==
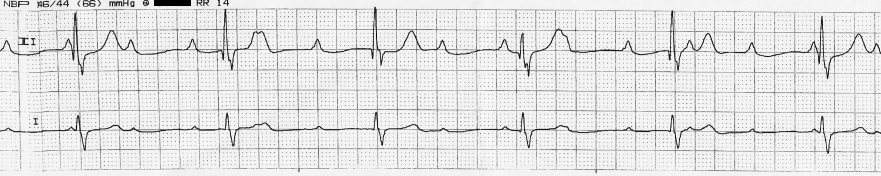
Leads I and II demonstrating complete AV block. Note that the P waves are not related to the QRS complexes (PP interval and QRS interval both constant), demonstrating that the atria are electrically disconnected from the ventricles. The QRS complexes represent an escape rhythm arising from the ventricle.

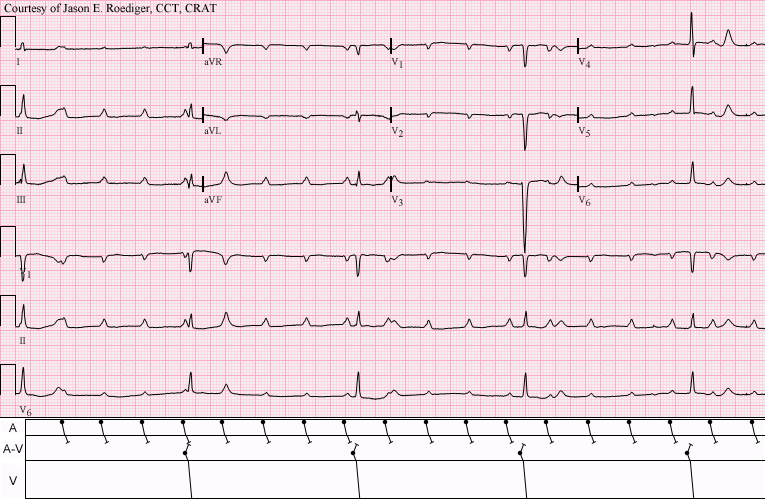
Atrial tachycardia with complete A-V block and resulting junctional escape

Many conditions can cause third-degree heart block, but the most common cause is coronary ischemia. Progressive degeneration of the electrical conduction system of the heart can lead to third-degree heart block. This may be preceded by first-degree AV block, second-degree AV block, bundle branch block, or bifascicular block. In addition, acute myocardial infarction may present with third-degree AV block.

An inferior wall myocardial infarction may cause damage to the AV node, causing third-degree heart block. In this case, the damage is usually transitory. Studies have shown that third-degree heart block in the setting of an inferior wall myocardial infarction typically resolves within 2 weeks. The escape rhythm typically originates in the AV junction, producing a narrow complex escape rhythm.

An anterior wall myocardial infarction may damage the distal conduction system of the heart, causing third-degree heart block. Initially demonstrated by animal studies, this is due to a stark reduction in the Kv β-subunit of the voltage-gated K+ channels in the pacemaker cells of the atrioventricular junction, causing significantly decreased propagation of ions across gap junctions between cardiac cells and thus prolonging the PR interval. This is typically extensive, permanent damage to the conduction system, eliciting a necessity for a permanent pacemaker to be placed. The escape rhythm typically originates in the ventricles, producing a wide complex escape rhythm.

Third-degree heart block may also be congenital and has been linked to the presence of lupus in the mother. It is thought that maternal antibodies may cross the placenta and attack the heart tissue during gestation. The cause of congenital third-degree heart block in many patients is unknown. Studies suggest that the prevalence of congenital third-degree heart block is approximately 1 in 22,000 live births.

Hyperkalemia in those with previous cardiac disease and Lyme disease can also result in third-degree heart block.

=== Hypermagnesemia ===
AV block may be observed in patients with hypermagnesemia who are receiving excessive intravenous doses of magnesium sulfate.

== Diagnosis ==
Diagnosis is largely focussed on analysis of the patients 12-lead ECG. A patient with a third-degree AV block will likely have p-waves not corresponding to QRS complexes along with bradycardia.

== Treatment ==
Atropine is often used as a first line treatment of a third-degree heart block in the presence of a narrow QRS which indicates a nodal block, but, may have little to no effect in an infra-nodal block. Atropine works by reducing vagal stimulation through the AV node but will not be effective in those who have had a previous heart transplant. Other drugs may be utilized such as epinephrine or dopamine which have positive chronotropic effects and may increase the heart rate. Treatment in emergency situations can involve electrical transcutaneous pacing in those who are acutely hemodynamically unstable and can be used regardless of the persons level of consciousness. Sedative agents such as a benzodiazepine or opiate may be used in conjunction with transcutaneous pacing to reduce the pain caused by the intervention.

In cases of suspected beta-blocker overdose, the heart-block may be treated with pharmacological agents to reverse the underlying cause with the use of glucagon. In the case of a calcium channel blocker overdose treated with calcium chloride and digitalis toxicity may be treated with the digoxin immune Fab.

Third-degree AV block can be treated more permanently with the use of a dual-chamber artificial pacemaker. This type of device typically listens for a pulse from the SA node via lead in the right atrium and sends a pulse via a lead to the right ventricle at an appropriate delay, driving both the right and left ventricles. Pacemakers in this role are usually programmed to enforce a minimum heart rate and to record instances of atrial flutter and atrial fibrillation, two common secondary conditions that can accompany third-degree AV block. Since pacemaker correction of the third-degree block requires full-time pacing of the ventricles, a potential side effect is pacemaker syndrome, and may necessitate the use of a biventricular pacemaker, which has an additional 3rd lead placed in a vein in the left ventricle, providing more coordinated pacing of both ventricles.

The 2005 Joint European Resuscitation and Resuscitation Council (UK) guidelines state that atropine is the first-line treatment especially if there were any adverse signs, namely: 1) heart rate < 40 bpm, 2) systolic blood pressure < 100 mm Hg, 3) signs of heart failure, and 4) ventricular arrhythmias requiring suppression. If these fail to respond to atropine or there is a potential risk of asystole, transvenous pacing is indicated. The risk factors for asystole include 1) previous asystole, 2) complete heart block with wide complexes, and 3) ventricular pause for > 3 seconds. Mobitz Type 2 AV block is another indication for pacing.

As with other forms of heart block, secondary prevention may also include medicines to control blood pressure and atrial fibrillation, as well as lifestyle and dietary changes to reduce risk factors associated with heart attack and stroke.

Early treatment of atrioventricular blockade is based on the presence and severity of symptoms and signs associated with ventricular escape rhythm. Hemodynamically unstable patients require immediate medication and in most cases temporary pacing to increase heart rate and cardiac output.

Once the patient is hemodynamically stable, a potentially reversible cause should be evaluated and treated. If no reversible cause is identified, a permanent pacemaker is inserted. Most stable patients have persistent bradycardia-related symptoms and require identification and treatment of any reversible cause or permanent implantable pacemaker.

Reversible causes of complete AV block should be ruled out before the insertion of a permanent pacemaker, such as drugs that slow heart rate and which induce hyperkalemia.

Complete atrioventricular block in acute myocardial infarction should be treated with temporary pacing and revascularization.

Complete atrioventricular block caused by hyperkalemia should be treated to lower serum potassium levels and patients with hypothyroidism should also receive thyroid hormone.

If there is no reversible cause, the clear treatment of complete atrioventricular block is mostly permanent pacemaker placement.

== Prognosis ==
The prognosis of patients with complete heart block is generally poor without therapy. Patients with 1st and 2nd-degree heart block are usually asymptomatic.

== See also ==
- Cardiac pacemaker
- Electrical conduction system of the heart
- Electrocardiogram (ECG)
- Atrioventricular block
- First-degree AV block
- Second-degree AV block
