= L. O. Wenckebach =

Dutch painter

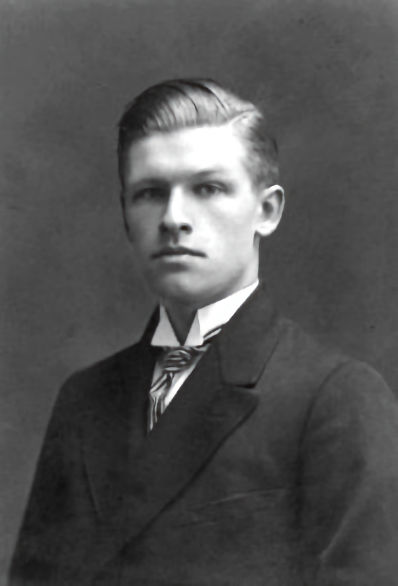
- Wenckebach c. 1913
- Born: Ludwig Oswald Wenckebach; 16 June 1895; Heerlen, Netherlands
- Died: 3 November 1962 (aged 67); Noordwijkerhout, Netherlands
- Occupations: Sculptor; painter
- Father: Karel Frederik Wenckebach

Ludwig Oswald Wenckebach (16 June 1895 – 3 November 1962) was a Dutch sculptor, painter, and medallist. He was the son of the anatomist Karel Frederik Wenckebach and nephew and pupil of the graphic designer and painter Willem Wenckebach. He started as a painter, but in 1920 switched to sculpting. He is best known for his many war monuments and designing the coins issued in the Netherlands between 1948 and 1980.

== Gallery ==
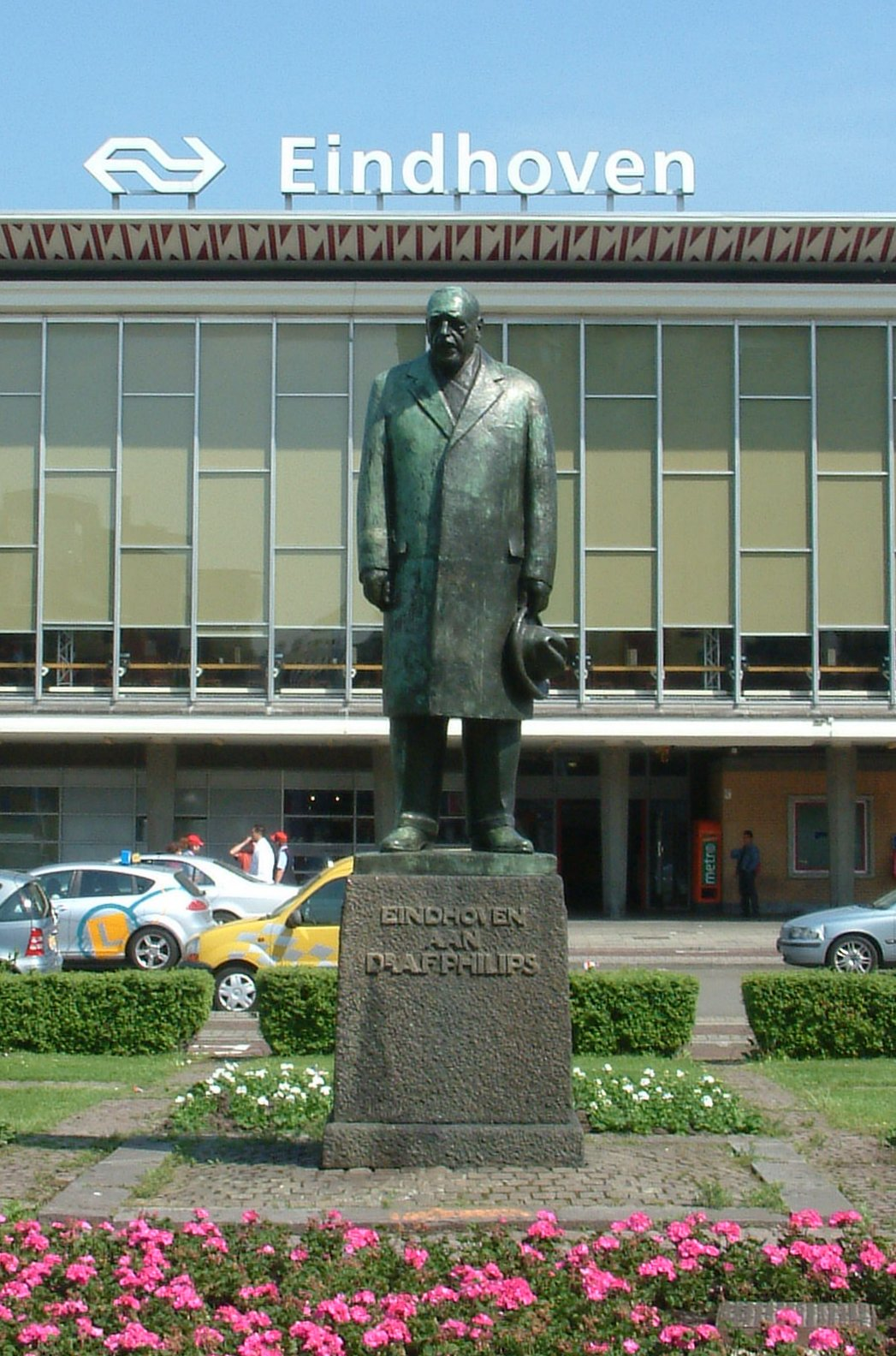
Anton Philips, Eindhoven

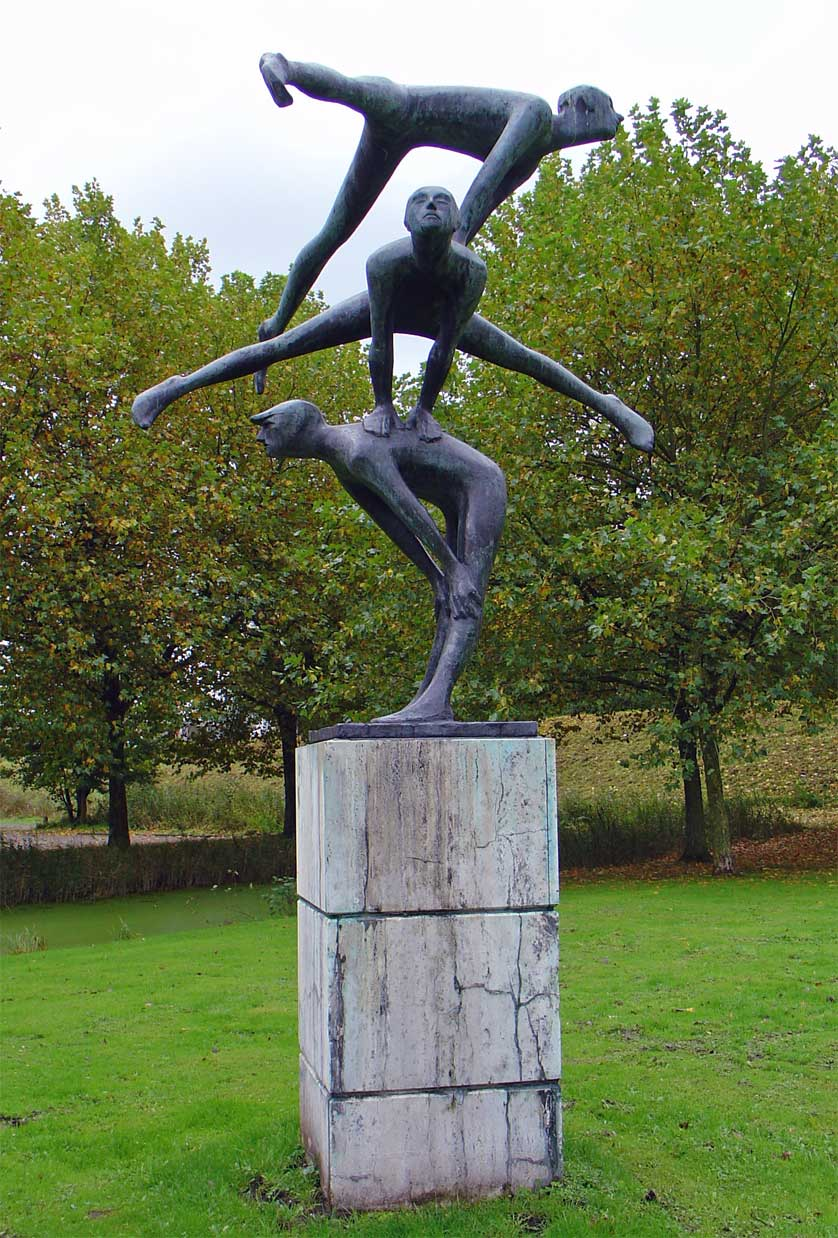
Three acrobats (1966), Gouda

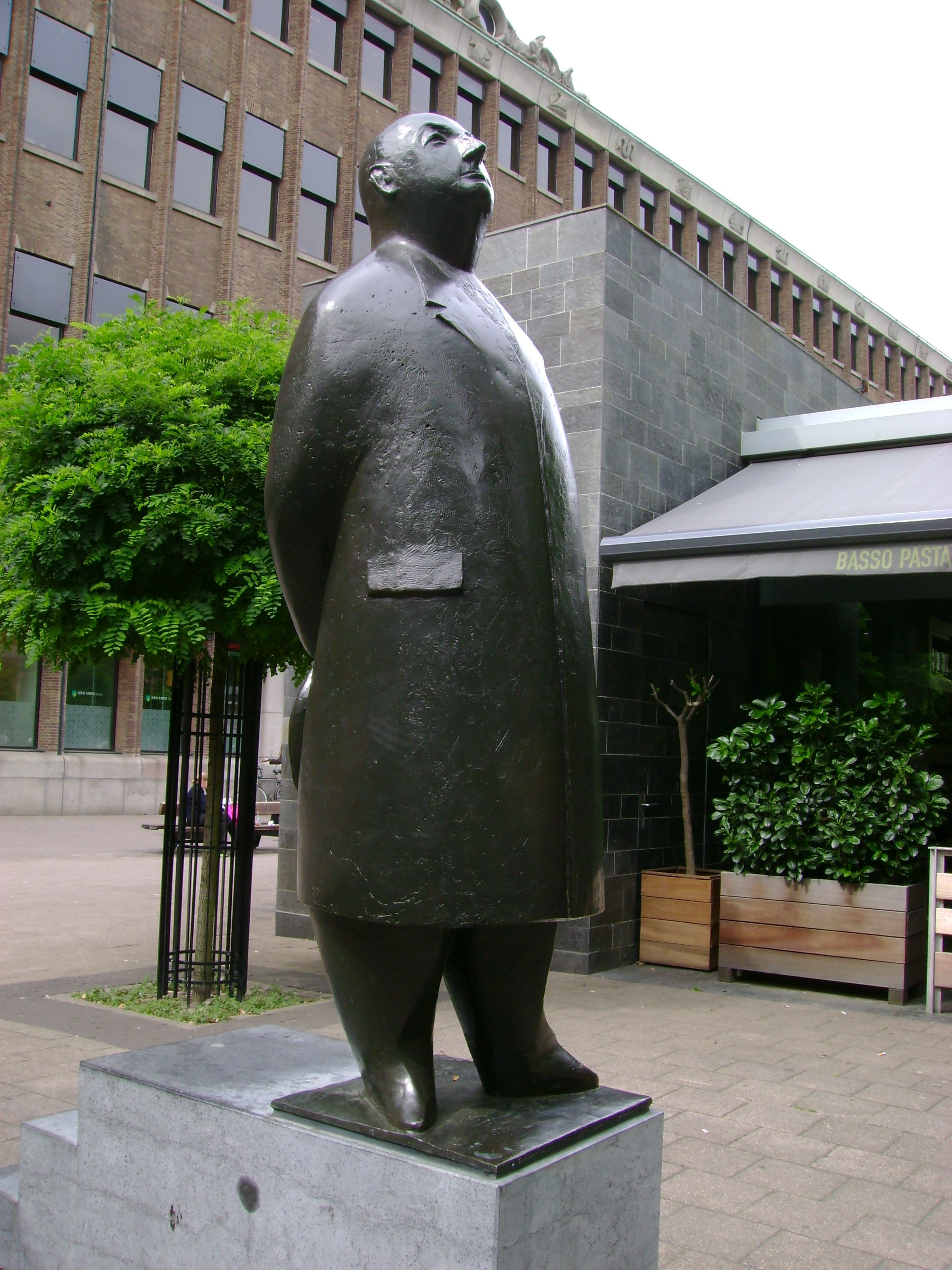
Monsieur Jacques (1956), Rotterdam

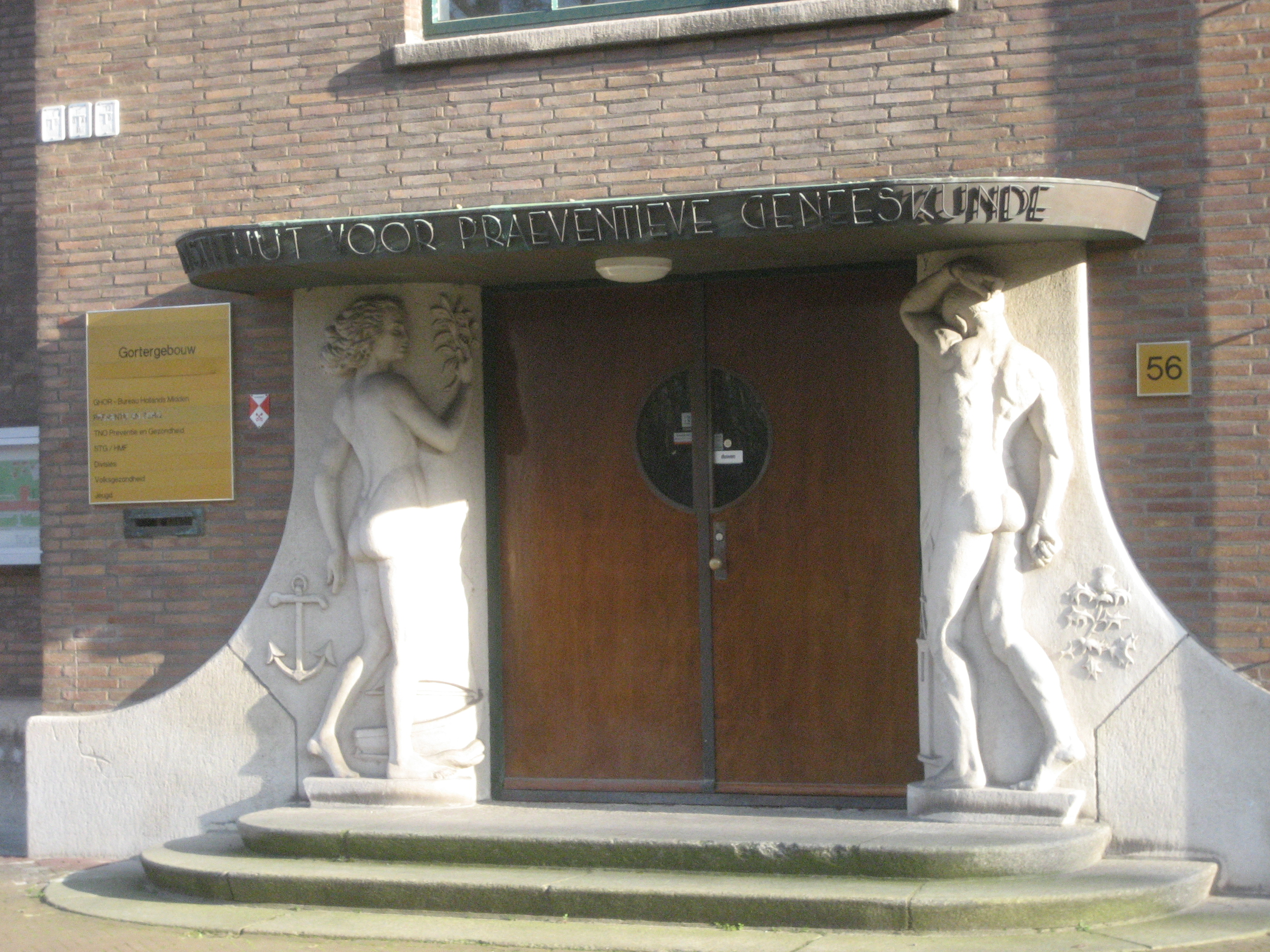
Hope & Sorrow, Gortergebouw Leiden

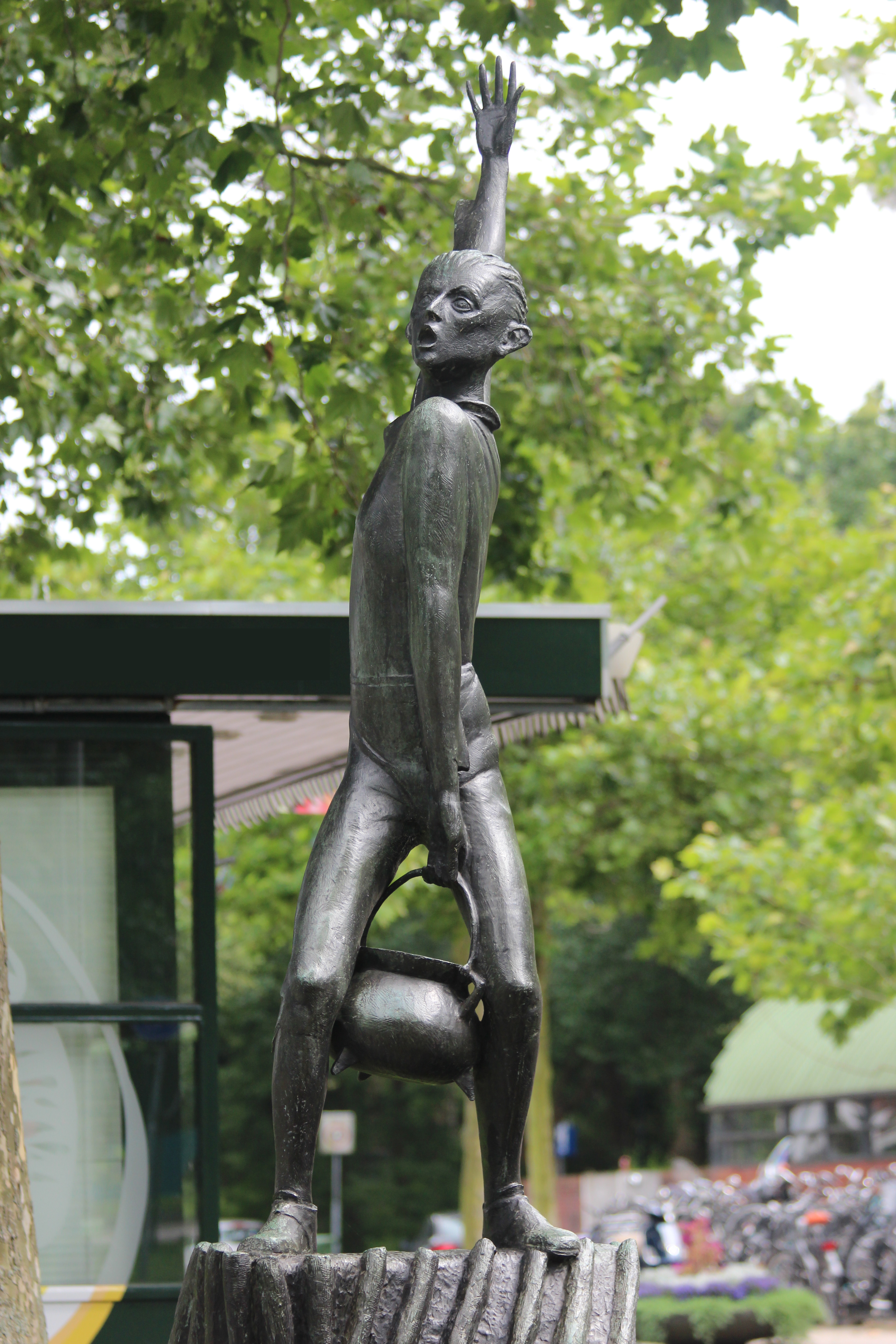
Cornelis Joppenszoon (1961), Leiden

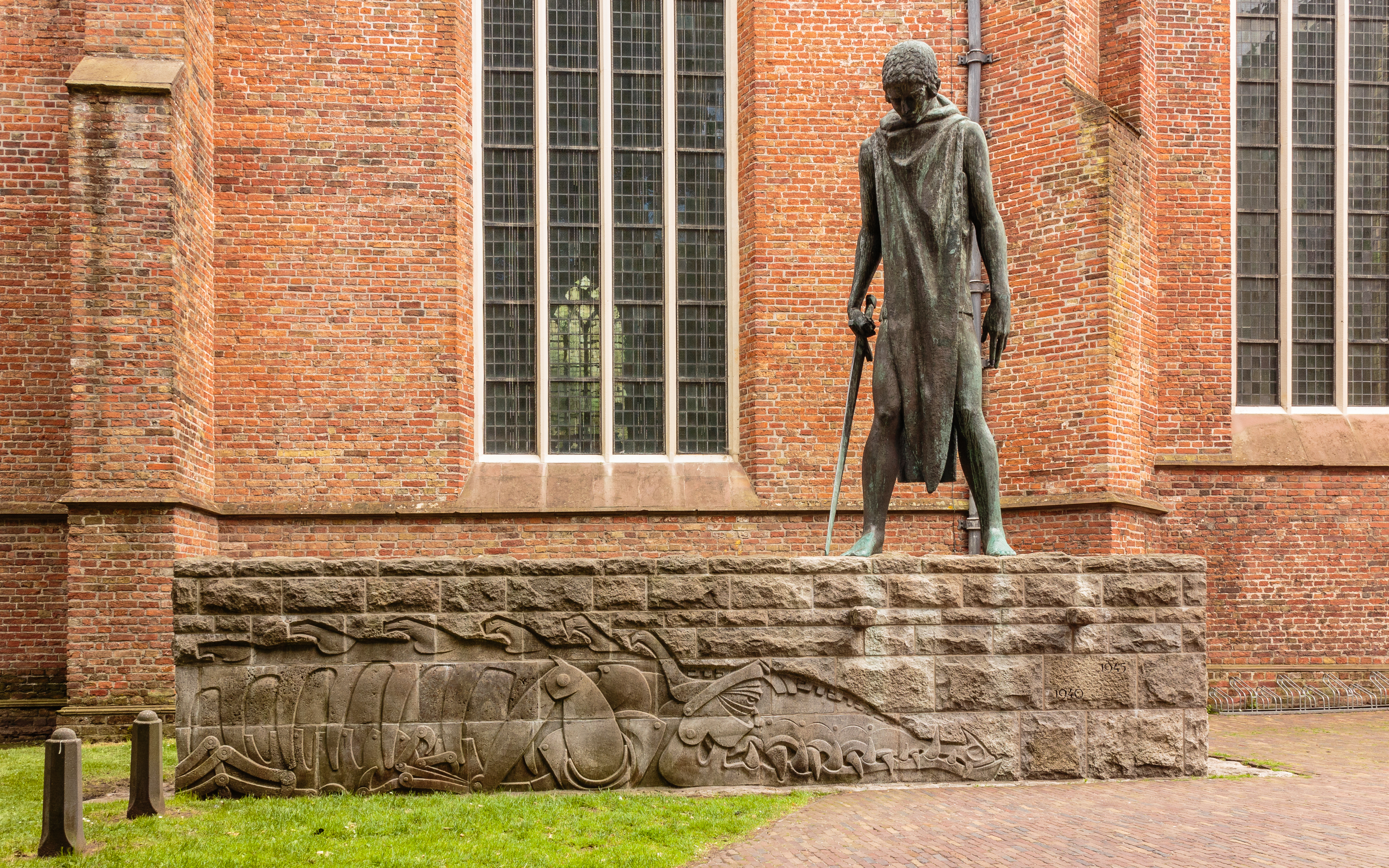
Sint-Joris en de draak (Groningen) provinciaal oorlogsmonument.

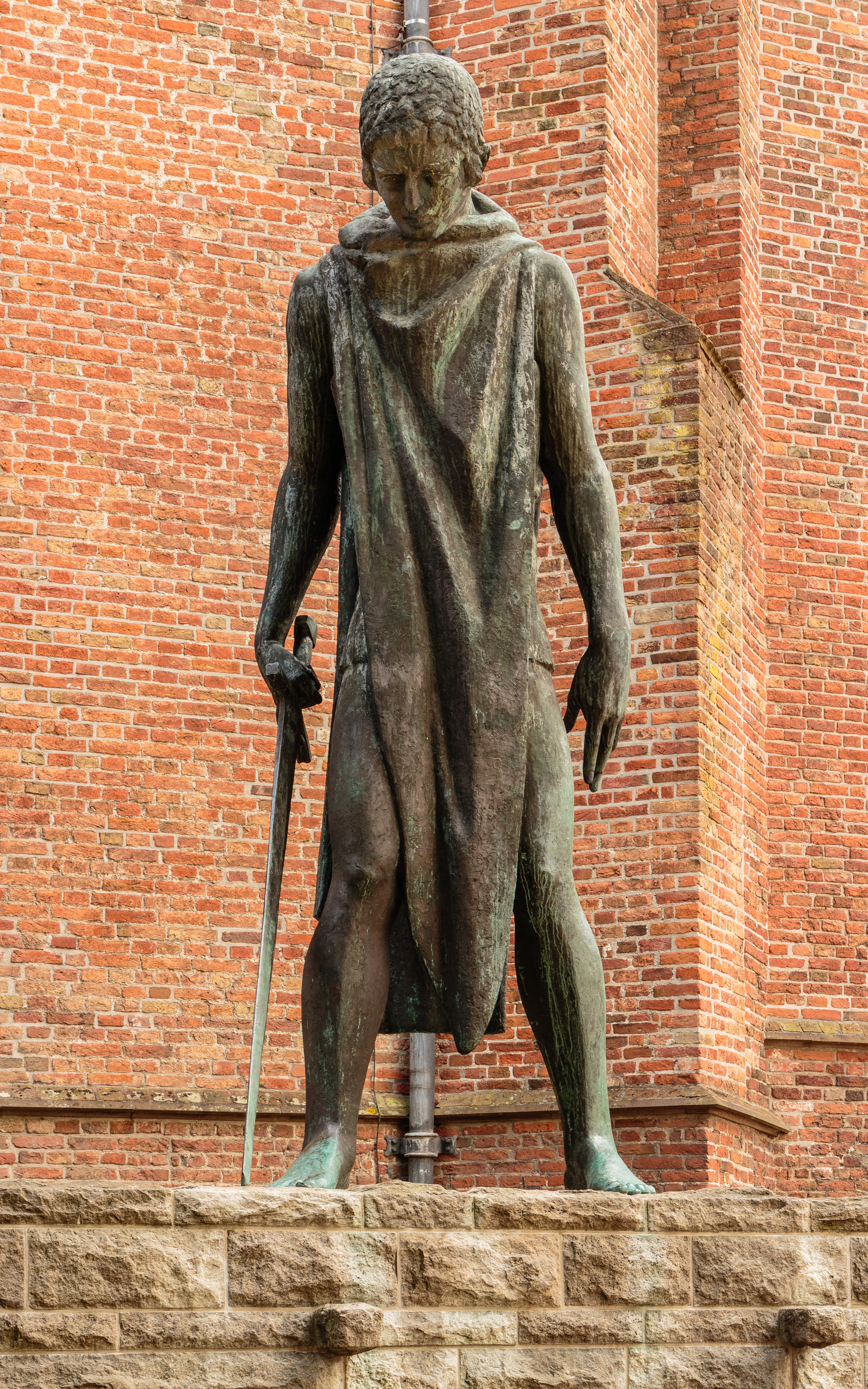
Detail Sint-Joris en de draak (Groningen) provinciaal oorlogsmonument.

== External sources ==
- Oswald Wenckebach at the Netherlands Institute for Art History.
