= Eagle score =

- Purpose: assess mortality during heart surgery

Eagle score is a five-point scoring system, used mainly for vascular patients, and allows for an accurate estimate of a patient's risk of dying during heart surgery.

== Main risk factors ==
- Age > 70
- Angina
- Myocardial infarction (history or Q waves)
- Congestive cardiac failure
- Diabetes

== Estimated mortality ==
0 factor: 3%
1-2 factors: 8%
3 factors: 18%
