= Heart block =

Disorder of heart rhythm

- This image shows bundle branch block where the beating rhythm is hindered, but not stopped. A blockage in Site A in the left ventricle blocks electrical signals from the atrium, causing the heart to rely on the right ventricle to maintain the correct rhythm. A:obstruction B:sinus node C:atrioventricular (AV) node 1:right atrium 2:left atrium 3:left ventricle 4:right ventricle
- Specialty: Cardiology

Heart block (HB) is a disorder in the heart's rhythm due to a fault in the natural pacemaker. This is caused by an obstruction – a block – in the electrical conduction system of the heart. Sometimes this disorder is inherited. Despite the severe-sounding name, heart block may cause no symptoms at all, or mere occasional missed heartbeats and ensuing light-headedness, syncope (fainting), and palpitations. Depending upon where in the heart, exactly, conduction is impaired (and how significantly), the disorder may require the implantation of an artificial pacemaker (a medical device that provides correct electrical impulses to trigger heartbeats, compensating for the natural pacemaker's unreliability); heart block is usually treatable.

Heart block should not be confused with other conditions which may or may not be co-occurring or possibly serious (and which relate to the heart and/or other nearby organs), such as angina (heart-related chest pain), heart attack (myocardial infarction), any heart failure, cardiogenic shock or other types of shock, different types of abnormal heart rhythms (arrhythmias), cardiac arrest, or respiratory arrest.

The human heart uses electrical signals to maintain and initiate the regular heartbeat in a living person. Conduction is initiated by the sinoatrial node ("sinus node" or "SA node"), and then travels to the atrioventricular node ("AV node") which also contains a secondary "pacemaker" that acts as a backup for the SA nodes, then to the bundle of His and then via the bundle branches to the point of the apex of the fascicular branches. Blockages are therefore classified based on where the blockage occurs – namely the SA node ("Sinoatrial block"), AV node ("AV block" or AVB), and at or below the bundle of His ("Intra-Hisian" or "Infra-Hisian block" respectively). Infra-Hisian blocks may occur at the left or right bundle branches ("bundle branch block") or the fascicles of the left bundle branch ("fascicular block" or "Hemiblock"). SA and AV node blocks are each divided into three degrees, with second-degree blocks being divided into two types (written either "type I" or "II" or "type 1" or "2"). The term "Wenckebach block" is also used for second-degree type 1 blocks of either the SA or AV node; in addition, second-degree blocks type 1 and 2 are also sometimes known as " Mobitz 1" and "Mobitz 2".

Clinically speaking, the blocks tend to have more serious potential the closer they are to the "end" of the electrical path (the muscles of the heart regulated by the heartbeat), and less serious effects the closer they are to the "start" (at the SA node), because the potential disruption becomes greater as more of the "path" is "blocked" from its "end" point. Therefore, most of the important heart blocks are AV nodal blocks and infra-Hisian blocks. SA blocks are usually of lesser clinical significance, since, in the event of an SA node block, the AV node contains a secondary pacemaker which would still maintain a heart rate of around 40–60 beats per minute, sufficient for consciousness and much of daily life in most cases.

== Types ==
Conduction system of the heart

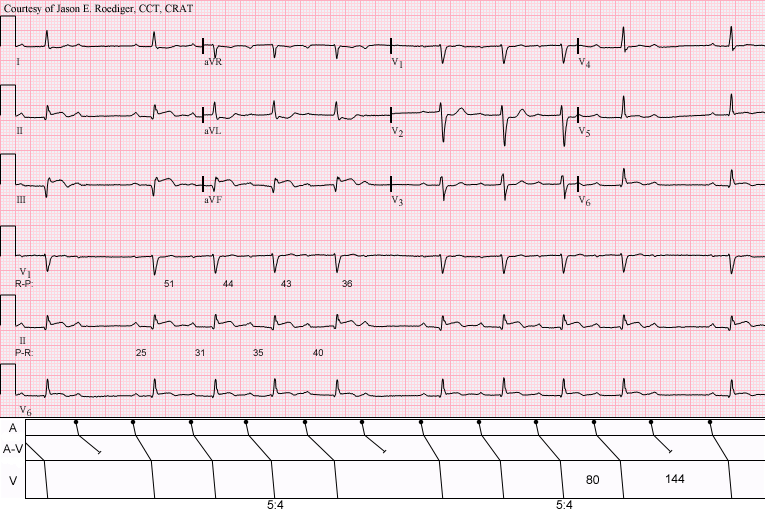
Sinus rhythm with acute inferior infarction complicated by Type I AV block manifest in the form of 5:4 Wenckebach periods; R-P/P-R reciprocity.

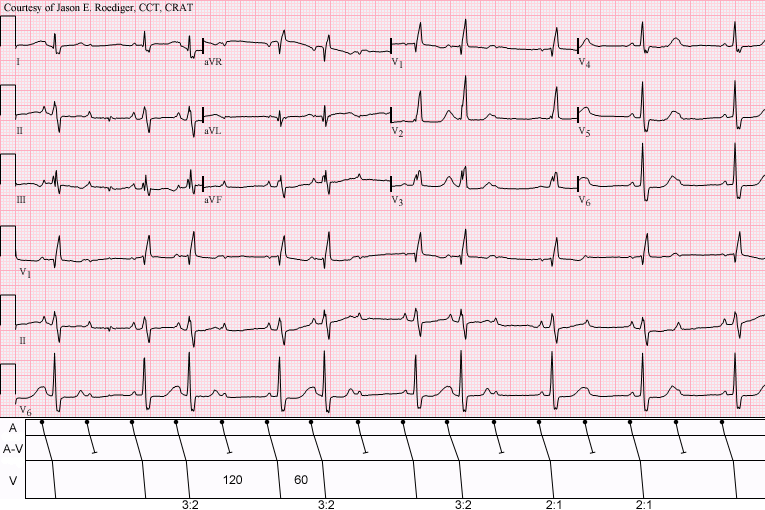
Sinus rhythm (rate = 100/min) with 3:2 and 2:1 Type II AV block; right bundle branch block

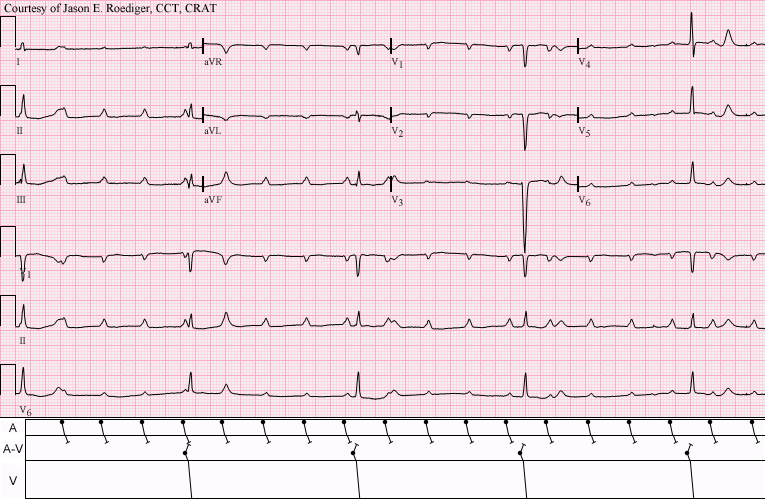
Sinus tachycardia with complete AV block and resulting junctional escape

Following the path of the electrical signals, the places where conduction can be blocked give rise to different kinds of heart blocks:

Location	Name
Within the sinoatrial node (SA node or Sinus node), where the heart's signals originate	Sinoatrial nodal blocks (often abbreviated "SA nodal block" or "SA block", sometimes written "Sinuatrial block")
Within the atrioventricular node (AV node)	Atrioventricular block (often abbreviated "AV nodal block", "AV block" or AVB).
At and below the bundle of His	Intra-Hisian blocks and Infra-Hisian blocks respectively.
Within the left or right bundle branches	Bundle branch blocks.
Within the fascicles of the left bundle branch	"Fascicular block" or hemiblocks.

SA and AV node blocks are each divided into three degrees, with second-degree blocks being divided into two types (written either "type I or II" or "type 1 or 2"). In an SA block, the electrical impulse is delayed or blocked on the way to the atria, thus delaying atrial depolarization. By contrast, an AV block occurs in the AV node and delays ventricular depolarization. The term "Wenckebach block" is also used for some heart blocks, and can refer to a second-degree type I block in either the SA node or the AV node; however, the ECG features of the two are quite distinctly different.

=== SA nodal blocks ===
SA blocks rarely give severe symptoms, because even if an individual had complete block at this level of the conduction system (which is uncommon), the secondary pacemaker of the heart would be at the AV node, which would fire at 40 to 60 beats a minute, which is enough to retain consciousness in the resting state. However, SA block is capable of causing problematic symptoms even so, and may also hint at conduction issues elsewhere in the heart, and therefore SA blocks are – despite their lower level of life-threatening risk – still "the most common indication for pacemaker implantation in the US".

Types of SA nodal blocks include:

- SA node Wenckebach (Mobitz I)
- SA node Mobitz II
- SA node exit block

In addition to the above blocks, the SA node can be suppressed by any other arrhythmia that reaches it. This includes retrograde conduction from the ventricles, ectopic atrial beats, atrial fibrillation, and atrial flutter.

The difference between SA node block and SA node suppression is that in SA node block, an electrical impulse is generated by the SA node that does not make the atria contract. In SA node suppression, on the other hand, the SA node does not generate an electrical impulse because it is reset by the electrical impulse that enters the SA node.

=== AV nodal blocks ===
There are three basic types of AV nodal block:

- First-degree AV block
- Second-degree AV block
  - Type 1 second-degree AV block (Mobitz I), also known as a Wenckebach block
  - Type 2 second-degree AV block (Mobitz II), also known as a Hay block – due to a block in or below the bundle of His
- Third-degree AV block (complete heart block)

=== Infra-Hisian block ===
An infra-Hisian block is that of the distal conduction system. Types of infra-Hisian block include:

- Type 2 second degree heart block (Mobitz II) – a type of AV block due to a block within or below the bundle of His
  - Left anterior fascicular block
  - Left posterior fascicular block
- Right bundle branch block
- Left bundle branch block

Of these types of infra-Hisian block, Mobitz II heart block is considered most important because of the possible progression to complete heart block.

=== Epidemiology ===
Data on the incidence and prevalence of heart block are relatively scarce. A recent study from the United Kingdom reported the incidence of heart block to have approximately doubled over the past two decades, now lying at 149 per 100 000 person-years. At the same age, men are about two-times more likely to develop heart block. Median age at heart block diagnosis is 75 years in men and 78 years in women.
