= Karel Frederik Wenckebach =

Dutch cardiologist

- Wenckebach c. 1906
- Born: March 24, 1864; The Hague, Netherlands
- Died: November 11, 1940 (aged 76); Vienna, Austria
- Known for: Wenckebach phenomenon
- Children: Ludwig Oswald
- Scientific career
- Fields: Anatomy; cardiology
- Workplaces: University of Groningen

Karel Frederik Wenckebach (Dutch: [ˈkaːrəl ˈfreːdərɪk ˌʋɛŋkəˈbɑx]; March 24, 1864 – November 11, 1940) was a Dutch anatomist who was a native of the Hague.

He studied medicine in Utrecht, and in 1901 become a professor of medicine at the University of Groningen. Later he was a professor at the Universities of Strasbourg (1911–14) and Vienna (1914–29).

== Contributions in cardiology ==
Wenckebach is primarily remembered for his work in cardiology. In 1899 he provided a description of irregular pulses due to partial blockage of atrioventricular conduction, creating a progressive lengthening of conduction time in cardiac tissue. The condition was referred to as a "second degree AV block" and later named the "Wenckebach phenomenon" and reclassified as Mobitz type I block in Mobitz's 1924 paper. A similar phenomenon can also occur in the sinoatrial node where it gives rise to type I second degree SA block, and this is also known as a Wenckebach block; the two have distinct features on an ECG however.

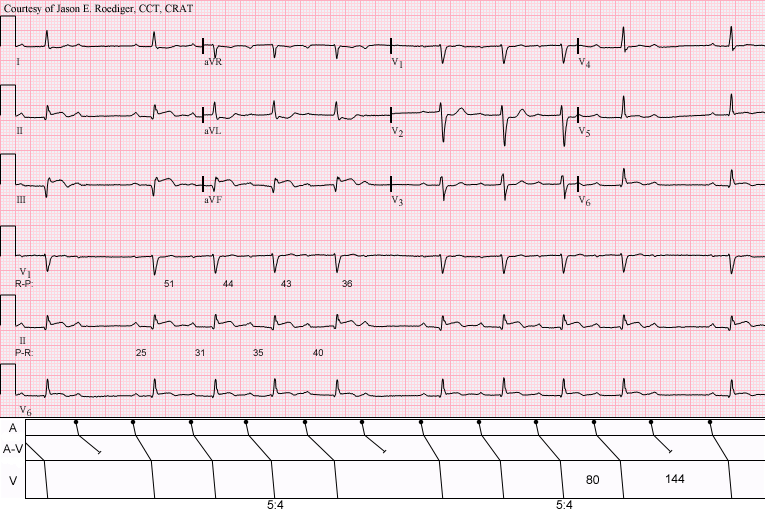
Sinus rhythm with acute inferior infarction complicated by Type I A-V block manifest in the form of 5:4 Wenckebach periods; R-P/P-R reciprocity.

Wenckebach is credited for describing the median bundle of the heart's conductive system that connects the sinoatrial node to the atrioventricular node. This bundle was named Wenckebach's bundle, and is also known as the middle internodal tract. Wenckebach's bundle is one of the three internodal pathways, the others being the "posterior internodal tract" (Thorel's pathway), and the "anterior internodal tract" (some fibers of which also project to Bachmann's bundle, and then into the left atrium).

Wenckebach was an early advocate involving the use of quinine for treatment of paroxysmal atrial fibrillation.

== Family ==
His father Eduard (1813–1874) has been credited with developing the very first telegraphic communications line in the Netherlands, between Haarlem and Amsterdam. He had two brothers, Henri Johan Eduard (1861–1924), director of the State Mines and later of the Dutch Ironworks in IJmuiden, and Ludwig Willem Reymert (1860–1937), a well-known painter and book illustrator. His son Oswald became a sculptor, painter and medallist, most widely known for his war monuments and designing the Dutch coins issued between 1948 and 1981.

== Selected writings ==
- Arythmie als Ausdruck bestimmter Funktionsstörungen des Herzens (1903, Engelse vertaling: (1904)
- Die unregelmässige Herztätigkeit und ihre klinische Bedeutung (1914)
- Herz- und Kreislaufinsufficienz (1931)
