= John Hay (cardiologist) =

British cardiologist (1873–1959)

- Born: 25 November 1873; Birkenhead
- Died: 21 April 1959 (aged 85); Bowness-on-Windermere
- Medical career
- Profession: physician
- Field: cardiology

John Hay (25 November 1873 – 21 April 1959) was a British cardiologist.

He was born in Birkenhead, Lancashire, the son of a Scottish architect and educated at the Liverpool Institute and the Victoria University of Manchester, qualifying M.B. in 1896.

From 1900 to 1903, he was medical tutor and registrar at the Liverpool Royal Infirmary. In 1905, he identified a form of second degree AV block. In 1907 he was appointed Assistant Physician and set up the first specialised heart department in the north of England.

He was elected a Fellow of the Royal College of Physicians in 1915 and in 1923 delivered their Bradshaw Lecture on Prognosis in Angina Pectoris. In 1924 he was appointed Professor of Medicine (part-time) at the University of Liverpool. He retired to live at Bowness in the Lake District, where he died in 1959.

He had married in 1906 Agnes Margaret Duncan, daughter of William Duncan of Tyldesley, Lancashire. They had two sons and two daughters.
