= First-degree atrioventricular block =

First-degree AV block
- Other names: First degree heart block, PR prolongation
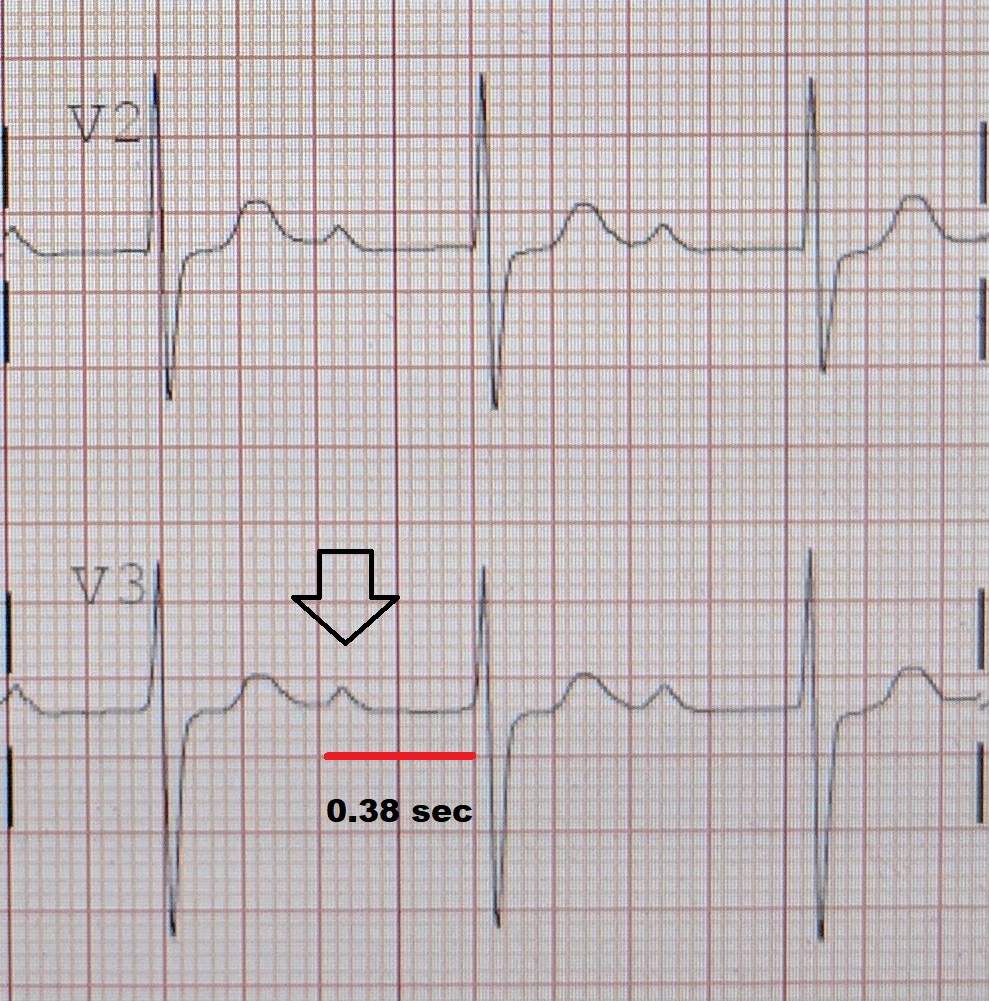
- An ECG showing a first degree AV block of greater than 300 ms
- Specialty: Cardiology
- Symptoms: Asymptomatic
- Complications: Progression to second or third degree AV block
- Causes: Fibrosis in AV node, medication, vagal tone, electrolyte disturbances
- Diagnostic method: Electrocardiogram
- Treatment: Avoidance of AV-nodal-blocking medication

First-degree atrioventricular block (AV block) is a disease of the electrical conduction system of the heart in which electrical impulses conduct from the cardiac atria to the ventricles through the atrioventricular node (AV node) more slowly than normal. First degree AV block does not generally cause any symptoms, but may progress to more severe forms of heart block such as second- and third-degree atrioventricular block. It is diagnosed using an electrocardiogram, and is defined as a PR interval greater than 200 milliseconds. First degree AV block affects 0.65-1.1% of the population with 0.13 new cases per 1000 persons each year.

== Causes ==
The most common causes of first-degree heart block are AV nodal disease, enhanced vagal tone (for example in athletes), myocarditis, acute myocardial infarction (especially acute inferior MI), electrolyte disturbances and medication. The medications that most commonly cause first-degree heart block are those that increase the refractory time of the AV node, thereby slowing AV conduction. These include calcium channel blockers, beta-blockers, cardiac glycosides, and anything that increases cholinergic activity such as cholinesterase inhibitors.

== Diagnosis ==
In normal individuals, the AV node slows the conduction of electrical impulses through the heart. This is manifest on a surface electrocardiogram (ECG) as the PR interval. The normal PR interval is from 120 ms to 200 ms in length. This is measured from the initial deflection of the P wave to the beginning of the QRS complex.

In first-degree heart block, the AV node conducts the electrical activity more slowly. This is seen as a PR interval greater than 200 ms in length on the surface ECG. It is usually an incidental finding on a routine ECG.

First-degree heart block does not require any particular investigations except for electrolyte and drug screens, especially if an overdose is suspected.

In comparison to second-degree atrioventricular block, in first-degree block there is an absence of non-conduction or "dropped beats."

In an electrophysiology study, this corresponds to a prolonged A-H interval that shows the time between atrial depolarization and His bundle depolarization near the AV node.

== Treatment ==
The management includes identifying and correcting electrolyte imbalances and withholding any offending medications. This condition does not require admission unless there is an associated myocardial infarction. Even though it usually does not progress to higher forms of heart block, it may require outpatient follow-up and monitoring of the ECG, especially if there is a comorbid bundle branch block. If there is a need for treatment of an unrelated condition, care should be taken not to introduce any medication that may slow AV conduction. If this is not feasible, clinicians should be very cautious when introducing any drug that may slow conduction; and regular monitoring of the ECG is indicated.

== Prognosis ==
Isolated first-degree heart block has no direct clinical consequences. There are no symptoms or signs associated with it. It was originally thought of as having a benign prognosis. In the Framingham Heart Study, however, the presence of a prolonged PR interval or first degree AV block doubled the risk of developing atrial fibrillation, tripled the risk of requiring an artificial pacemaker, and was associated with a small increase in mortality. This risk was proportional to the degree of PR prolongation.

A subset of individuals with the triad of first-degree heart block, right bundle branch block, and either left anterior fascicular block or left posterior fascicular block (known as trifascicular block) may be at an increased risk of progression to complete heart block.

== See also ==
- Atrioventricular block
- Second-degree atrioventricular block
- Third-degree atrioventricular block
