= Transcutaneous pacing =

Method of temporary stabilizing an individual's heartbeat

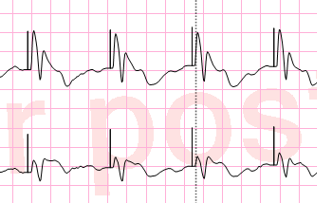
True electrical and mechanical capture

Transcutaneous pacing (TCP), also called external pacing, is a temporary means of pacing a patient's heart during a medical emergency. It should not be confused with defibrillation (used in more serious cases, in ventricular fibrillation and other shockable rhythms) using a manual or automatic defibrillator, though some newer defibrillators can do both, and pads and an electrical stimulus to the heart are used in transcutaneous pacing and defibrillation. Transcutaneous pacing is accomplished by delivering pulses of electric current through the patient's chest, which stimulates the heart to contract.

The most common indication for transcutaneous pacing is an abnormally slow heart rate. By convention, a heart rate of fewer than 60 beats per minute in the adult patient is called bradycardia. Not all instances of bradycardia require medical treatment. Normal heart rate varies substantially between individuals, and many athletes in particular have a relatively slow resting heart rate. In addition, the heart rate is known to naturally slow with age. It is only when bradycardia presents with signs and symptoms of shock that it requires emergency treatment with transcutaneous pacing.

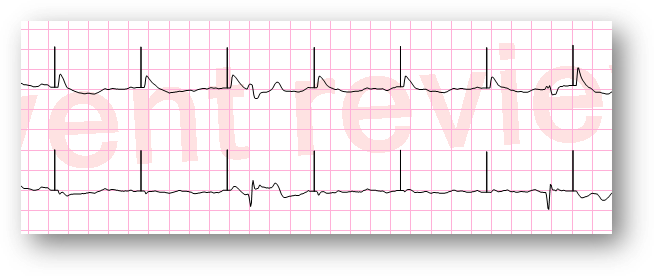
False capture with visible phantom beats

Some common causes of hemodynamically significant bradycardia include myocardial infarction, sinus node dysfunction and complete heart block.

Transcutaneous pacing is no longer indicated for the treatment of asystole (cardiac arrest associated with a "flat line" on the ECG), with the possible exception of witnessed asystole (as in the case of bifascicular block that progresses to complete heart block without an escape rhythm).

== Process ==
During transcutaneous pacing, pads are placed on the patient's chest, either in the anterior/lateral position or the anterior/posterior position. The anterior/posterior position is preferred as it minimizes transthoracic electrical impedance by "sandwiching" the heart between the two pads. The pads are then attached to a monitor/defibrillator, a heart rate is selected, and current (measured in milliamps) is increased until electrical capture (characterized by a wide QRS complex with tall, broad T wave on the ECG) is obtained, with a corresponding pulse. Pacing artifact on the ECG and severe muscle twitching may make this determination difficult. It is therefore advisable to use another instrument (e.g. SpO2 monitor or bedside doppler) to confirm mechanical capture.

Transcutaneous pacing may be uncomfortable for the patient. Sedation should therefore be considered. Before pacing the patient in a prehospital setting sedation is recommended by administering an analgesic or an anxiolytic. Prolonged transcutaneous pacing may cause burns on the skin. According to the Zoll M Series Operator's Guide," Continuous pacing of neonates can cause skin burns. If it is necessary to pace for more than 30 minutes, periodic inspection of the underlying skin is strongly advised." It is meant to stabilize the patient until a more permanent means of pacing is achieved.

Other forms of cardiac pacing are transvenous pacing, epicardial pacing, and permanent pacing with an implantable pacemaker.

In addition to synchronized transcutaneous pacing offered by newer cardiac monitor/defibrillators, there is also an option for asynchronous pacing. Sometimes in the prehospital setting a situation may arise where ECG electrodes are not available or something interferes with their adhesion to the patient's skin. In these rare situations where the patient must be paced and there are no other alternatives, asynchronous pacing may be used. Again, this setting should only be used as a last resort due to possible adverse cardiac effects it could cause.

== See also ==
- Implantable cardioverter-defibrillator
- Defibrillation
- Heart rate variability
- Palpitations
