= P wave (electrocardiography) =

Electrocardiogram waveform representing atrial contraction

Normal P wave, shown in darker red

Diagram demonstrating features of a normal sinus rhythm electrocardiogram wave

In cardiology, the P wave on an electrocardiogram (ECG) represents atrial depolarization, which results in atrial contraction, or atrial systole.

== Physiology ==
The P wave is a summation wave generated by the depolarization front as it transits the atria. Normally the right atrium depolarizes slightly earlier than left atrium since the depolarization wave originates in the sinoatrial node, in the high right atrium and then travels to and through the left atrium. The depolarization front is carried through the atria along semi-specialized conduction pathways including Bachmann's bundle resulting in uniform shaped waves. Depolarization originating elsewhere in the atria (atrial ectopics) result in P waves with a different morphology from normal.

== Pathology ==
Characteristic peaked P wave of cor pulmonale

Peaked P waves (> 0.25 mV) suggest right atrial enlargement, cor pulmonale (P pulmonale rhythm), but have a low predictive value (~20%).

A P wave with increased amplitude can indicate hypokalemia. It can also indicate right atrial enlargement.

A P wave with decreased amplitude can indicate hyperkalemia.

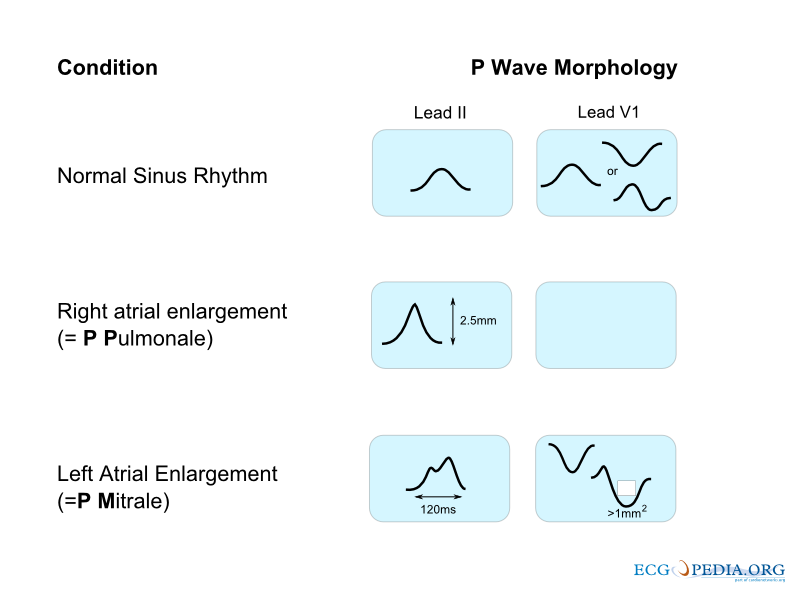
P-wave changes in left and right atrial hypertrophy

Bifid P waves (known as P mitrale) indicate left-atrial abnormality - e.g. dilatation or hypertrophy.

If at least three different shaped P waves can be seen in a given ECG lead tracing, this implies that even if one of them arises from the SA node, at least two others are arising elsewhere. This is taken as evidence of multiple (i.e. at least two) ectopic foci, and is called multifocal (or more correctly, multiform) atrial rhythm if the rate is ≤100) or multifocal atrial tachycardia if the rate is over 100. This appears particularly commonly in exacerbations of chronic obstructive lung disease.

If the baseline has a totally irregular form, this suggests fibrillatory waves of atrial fibrillation or possibly artefact; a sawtooth-shaped baseline suggests the flutter waves of atrial flutter. With either of these rhythms, if the ventricular rate is fast, the fibrillatory or flutter waves can easily be misinterpreted as P waves.

Absence of the P wave with a flat baseline may indicate:

- Fine atrial fibrillation
- Sinoatrial arrest (with a secondary escape rhythm)

If P waves are not clearly delineated in the surface ECG, a Lewis lead may be used to better visualize P waves.

== Atrial repolarization ==
This occurs a mean of 320 ms after the end of the P wave, with a duration of two to three times that of the P wave and a polarity always opposite to that of the P wave. It is represented on the surface ECG by a so-called Ta wave. The clinical relevance of this is that, although a normal phenomenon, the nadir of the Ta wave can occur just after the QRS complex and cause ST depression similar to (and easily mistaken with) that occurring with disease states such as cardiac ischaemia.

== Related pages ==
- Electrocardiography
- PR interval
- QRS complex
- QT interval
- ST segment
- T wave
- U wave
