= PR interval =

Period in electrocardiography

Schematic representation of a normal sinus rhythm EKG wave

In electrocardiography, the PR interval is the period, measured in milliseconds, that extends from the beginning of the P wave (the onset of atrial depolarization) until the beginning of the QRS complex (the onset of ventricular depolarization); it is normally between 120 and 200 ms in duration. The PR interval is sometimes termed the PQ interval.

== Interpretation ==
Variations in the PQ interval can be associated with certain medical conditions:

- Duration
  - A long PR interval (of over 200 ms) indicates a slowing of conduction between the atria and ventricles, usually due to slow conduction through the atrioventricular node (AV node). This is known as first degree heart block. Prolongation can be associated with fibrosis of the AV node, high vagal tone, medications that slow the AV node such as beta-blockers, hypokalemia, acute rheumatic fever, or carditis associated with Lyme disease.
  - A short PR interval (of less than 120ms) may be associated with a Pre-excitation syndromes such as Wolff–Parkinson–White syndrome or Lown–Ganong–Levine syndrome, and also junctional arrhythmia like atrioventricular reentrant tachycardia or junctional rhythm.
  - A variable PR interval may indicate other types of heart block.
- PR segment depression may indicate atrial injury or pericarditis.

PQ segment divided into parts corresponding to the location in heart's electrical conduction system

== See also ==
- P wave
