= List of circulatory system conditions =

This is an incomplete list, which may never be able to satisfy certain standards for completion.

There are many conditions of or affecting the human circulatory system — the biological system that includes the pumping and channeling of blood to and from the body and lungs with heart, blood and blood vessels.

== Cardiovascular ==
- Angina
- Acute coronary syndrome
- Anomic aphasia
- Aortic dissection
- Aortic regurgitation
- Aortic stenosis
- Apoplexy
- Apraxia
- Arrhythmias
- Asymmetric septal hypertrophy (ASH)
- Atherosclerosis
- Atrial flutter
- Atrial septal defect
- Atrioventricular canal defect
- Atrioventricular septal defect
- Avascular necrosis

== Cardiac electrophysiology ==
See also Category:Cardiac electrophysiology

- AV nodal reentrant tachycardia (Atrioventricular nodal reentrant tachycardia)
- Accelerated idioventricular rhythm
- Andersen–Tawil syndrome (Andersen cardiodysrhythmic periodic paralysis, Andersen syndrome, Long QT syndrome 7; Periodic paralysis, potassium-sensitive cardiodysrhythmic type)
- Ashman phenomenon (Ashman beats)
- Atrial fibrillation
- Atrial fibrillation with rapid ventricular response
- Atrial flutter
- Atrial tachycardia
- Bifascicular block
- Brugada syndrome (Sudden Unexpected Death Syndrome)
- Bundle branch block
- Cardiac dysrhythmia (Cardiac arrhythmia)
- Catecholaminergic polymorphic ventricular tachycardia
- Ectopic beat (cardiac ectopy)
- Ectopic pacemaker (Ectopic focus)
- First-degree atrioventricular block (First-degree AV block, PR prolongation)
- Heart block
- Inappropriate sinus tachycardia
- Jervell and Lange-Nielsen syndrome
- Junctional escape beat
- Junctional rhythm
- Left bundle branch block
- Left anterior fascicular block
- Left axis deviation
- Lev's disease (Lenegre-Lev syndrome)
- Long QT syndrome
- Lown–Ganong–Levine syndrome
- Multifocal atrial tachycardia
- Wolff–Parkinson–White syndrome

== Congenital heart disease ==
See also Category:Congenital heart defects

- Aortic coarctation (Aortic coarctation)
- Acyanotic heart defect
- Atrial septal defect
- Cor triatriatum
- Dextro-Transposition of the great arteries
- Double aortic arch
- Double inlet left ventricle
- Double outlet right ventricle
- Ebstein's anomaly
- GUCH

=== Cyanotic heart defect ===
- Tetralogy of Fallot (ToF)
- Total anomalous pulmonary venous connection
- Hypoplastic left heart syndrome (HLHS)
- Transposition of the great arteries (d-TGA)
- Truncus arteriosus (Persistent)
- Tricuspid atresia
- Interrupted aortic arch
- Coarctation of aorta
- Pulmonary atresia (PA)
- Pulmonary stenosis (critical)

=== Non-cyanotic heart defects ===
- Atrial septal defect
- Ventricular septal defect
- Patent ductus arteriosus and
- Coarctation of aorta (may cause cyanosis in some cases)

== Ischemic heart diseases ==
See also Category:Ischemic heart diseases

- Angina pectoris
- Acute coronary syndrome
- Acute myocardial infarction

== Valvular heart disease ==
See also Category:Valvular heart disease

- Aortic insufficiency
- Mitral stenosis
- Tricuspid valve stenosis
- Pulmonary valve stenosis
- Mitral insufficiency/regurgitation
- Tricuspid insufficiency/regurgitation
- Pulmonary insufficiency/regurgitation

== Vascular disease ==
See also Category:Vascular surgery

- Aortic aneurysm
