= Lorcainide =

Antiarrythmic agent

Clinical data
- ATC code: C01BC07 (WHO)

Pharmacokinetic data
- Protein binding: 78
- Elimination half-life: 14.3 +/-3.7

Identifiers
- IUPAC name: N-(4-chlorophenyl)-N-(1-isopropylpiperidin-4-yl)-2-phenylacetamide
- CAS Number: 59729-31-6
- PubChem CID: 42884
- ChemSpider: 39116
- UNII: KGJ2T0N7IQ
- KEGG: D08020
- ChEMBL: ChEMBL87543
- CompTox Dashboard (EPA): DTXSID2023226

Chemical and physical data
- Formula: C_{22}H_{27}ClN_{2}O
- Molar mass: 370.92 g·mol^{−1}
- 3D model (JSmol): Interactive image
- SMILES: Clc3ccc(N(C(=O)Cc1ccccc1)C2CCN(C(C)C)CC2)cc3
- InChI: InChI=1S/C22H27ClN2O/c1-17(2)24-14-12-21(13-15-24)25(20-10-8-19(23)9-11-20)22(26)16-18-6-4-3-5-7-18/h3-11,17,21H,12-16H2,1-2H3; Key:XHOJAWVAWFHGHL-UHFFFAOYSA-N

Lorcainide (Lorcainide hydrochloride) is a Class 1c antiarrhythmic agent that is used to help restore normal heart rhythm and conduction in patients with premature ventricular contractions, ventricular tachycardiac and Wolff–Parkinson–White syndrome. Lorcainide was developed by Janssen Pharmaceutica (Belgium) in 1968 under the commercial name Remivox and is designated by code numbers R-15889 or Ro 13-1042/001. It has a half-life of 8.9 +- 2.3 hrs which may be prolonged to 66 hrs in people with cardiac disease.

== Arrhythmia ==
Cardiac dysrhythmia is a heart rate disorder that manifests as an altered cardiac rhythm. It results from either abnormal pacemaker activity or a disturbance in impulse propagation, or both. Arrhythmias can be caused by various conditions including ischemia, hypoxia, pH disruptions, B adrenergic activation, drug interactions or the presence of diseased tissue. These events can trigger the development of ectopic pacemaker in the heart, which emit abnormal impulses at random times during the cardiac cycle. An arrhythmia can present itself as either bradycardia or tachycardia. Untreated arrhythmias may progress to atrial fibrillation or ventricular fibrillation. Treatment is aimed at normalizing cardiac rhythm by altering ion flow across the membrane. Antiarrhythmic agents can reduce arrhythmia related symptoms such as palpitations or syncope; however, they often have a narrow therapeutic index and can also be proarrhythmic.

== Wolff–Parkinson–White syndrome ==
Wolff–Parkinson–White syndrome (WPW) is a pre-excitation syndrome in which individuals are predisposed to supraventricular tachyarrhythmias (rapid and irregular heart beats). People with this condition have an extra or accessory atrioventricular conduction pathway that causes re-entry tachycardia. WPW is characterized by a short PR interval (<0.12 second) and a prolonged, slurred QRS complex (>0.12 seconds).

== Class 1c activity ==
Fast-acting voltage-gated sodium channels (Nav1.5) found in high concentrations in the ventricular myocytes, open at a membrane potential of −80 mv in typical cardiac rhythm. This will result in a rapid upstroke of an action potential that leads to contraction of the ventricles. Class 1c drugs have local anesthetic properties and have a high affinity for open Nav1.5 (but not closed or inactive Nav1.5), thus irreversibly binding and reducing the fast Na+ influx. Interactions of Lorcainide with Nav1.5 are time and voltage dependent. Class 1c drugs have a characteristically slow dissociation rate, which will slow the upstroke duration and amplitude of ventricular myocytes’ action potential and prolong the PR, QRS and QT intervals of an ECG. Lorcainide also increases the ventricular fibrillation threshold in a dose-dependent fashion. Overall, Lorcainide causes a decrease in tachycardiac events, but also reduced ventricular contractility ejection fraction. The effect on sinus node function is controversial, as some researchers have noted a decreased sinus cycle length and increase in sinus node recovery, whereas others have observed no change.

== Other activities ==
Lorcainide inhibits adenosine 5’-triphosphate (ATP)-hydrolytic action of myocardial Na+K+ATPase in-vitro in a concentration dependent manner. The mode of action and the implications of this finding are not well known.

== Benefits and risks ==
Lorcainide exhibits a prolonged duration of action (approximately 8-10 hrs), is well absorbed when taken orally and has a good safety profile as well as a good drug efficacy. Hematologic, biochemical and urinary analysis of Lorcainide revealed no significant abnormalities. However, an increased prevalence of central nervous system effects, including headache, dizziness and sleep disturbances have been associated with oral dosages of Lorcainide when compared to intravenous administration. This could be due to a greater accumulation of plasma Noriorcainide when exposed to oral Lorcainide. Noriorcainide, an N-dealkylated derivative, is an active metabolite of Lorcainide. It is as potent as its parent compound with similar antiarrhythmic efficacy, wherein it suppresses chronic premature ventricular complexes. It has a half life of 26.5 +-7.2 hrs.

== Synthesis ==

The starting material is the imine formed by combining 4-chloroaniline and N-carbethoxy-4-piperidone, which is reduced with sodium borohydride and then acylated with the acid chloride of phenylacetic acid to produce an amide. Selective hydrolysis with hydrobromic acid, followed by alkylation with isopropyl bromide gives lorcainide.
