= Arrhythmia =

Group of medical conditions characterized by irregular heartbeat

- Other names: Cardiac arrhythmia, heart arrhythmia, dysrhythmia, irregular heartbeat
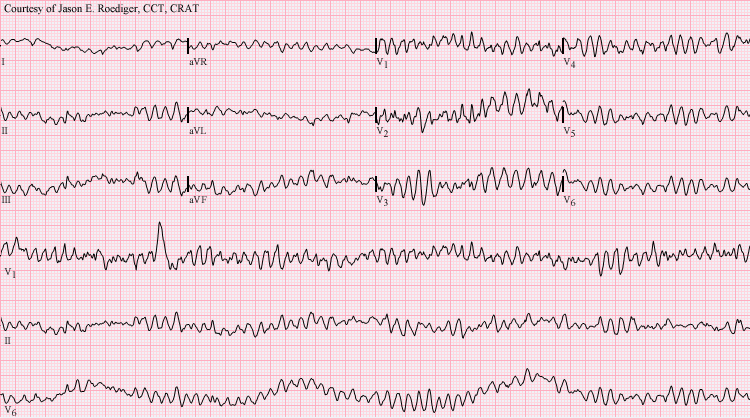
- Ventricular fibrillation (VF) showing disorganized electrical activity producing a spiked tracing on an electrocardiogram (ECG)
- Specialty: Cardiology
- Symptoms: Palpitations, dizziness or lightheadedness, passing out, shortness of breath, chest pain, decreased level of consciousness
- Complications: Stroke, heart failure, cardiac arrest
- Usual onset: Older age
- Types: Extra beats, supraventricular tachycardias, ventricular arrhythmias, bradyarrhythmias
- Causes: Problems with the electrical conduction system of the heart
- Diagnostic method: Electrocardiogram, Holter monitor
- Treatment: Medications, medical procedures (pacemaker), surgery
- Frequency: Millions

Emma's irregular heartbeat
Heart sounds of a girl experiencing arrhythmia after exercising.

Arrhythmias, also known as cardiac arrhythmias, are irregularities in the heartbeat, which may be too fast or too slow. Essentially, arrhythmia is a deviation from the normal sinus rhythm. A resting heart rate that is too fast – above 100 beats per minute in adults – is called tachycardia, and a resting heart rate that is too slow – below 60 beats per minute – is called bradycardia. Some types of arrhythmias have no symptoms. Symptoms, when present, may include palpitations or feeling a pause between heartbeats. In more serious cases, there may be lightheadedness, passing out, shortness of breath, chest pain, or decreased level of consciousness. While most cases of arrhythmia are not serious, some predispose a person to complications such as stroke or heart failure. Others may result in sudden death.

Arrhythmias are often categorized into four groups: extra beats, supraventricular tachycardias, ventricular arrhythmias and bradyarrhythmias. Extra beats include premature atrial contractions, premature ventricular contractions and premature junctional contractions. Supraventricular tachycardias include atrial fibrillation, atrial flutter and paroxysmal supraventricular tachycardia. Ventricular arrhythmias include ventricular fibrillation and ventricular tachycardia. Bradyarrhythmias are due to sinus node dysfunction or atrioventricular conduction disturbances. Arrhythmias are due to problems with the electrical conduction system of the heart. A number of tests can help with diagnosis, including an electrocardiogram (ECG) and Holter monitor.

Many arrhythmias can be effectively treated. Treatments may include medications, medical procedures such as inserting a pacemaker, and surgery. Medications for a fast heart rate may include beta blockers, or antiarrhythmic agents such as procainamide, which attempt to restore a normal heart rhythm. This latter group may have more significant side effects, especially if taken for a long period of time. Pacemakers are often used for slow heart rates. Those with an irregular heartbeat are often treated with blood thinners to reduce the risk of complications. Those who have severe symptoms from an arrhythmia or are medically unstable may receive urgent treatment with a controlled electric shock in the form of cardioversion or defibrillation.

Arrhythmia affects millions of people. In Europe and North America, as of 2014, atrial fibrillation affects about 2% to 3% of the population. Atrial fibrillation and atrial flutter resulted in 112,000 deaths in 2013, up from 29,000 in 1990. However, in most recent cases concerning the SARS-CoV‑2 pandemic, cardiac arrhythmias are commonly developed and associated with high morbidity and mortality among patients hospitalized with the COVID-19 infection, due to the infection's ability to cause myocardial injury. Sudden cardiac death is the cause of about half of deaths due to cardiovascular disease and about 15% of all deaths globally. About 80% of sudden cardiac death is the result of ventricular arrhythmias. Arrhythmias may occur at any age but are more common among older people. Arrhythmias may also occur in children; however, the normal range for the heart rate varies with age.

== Classification ==
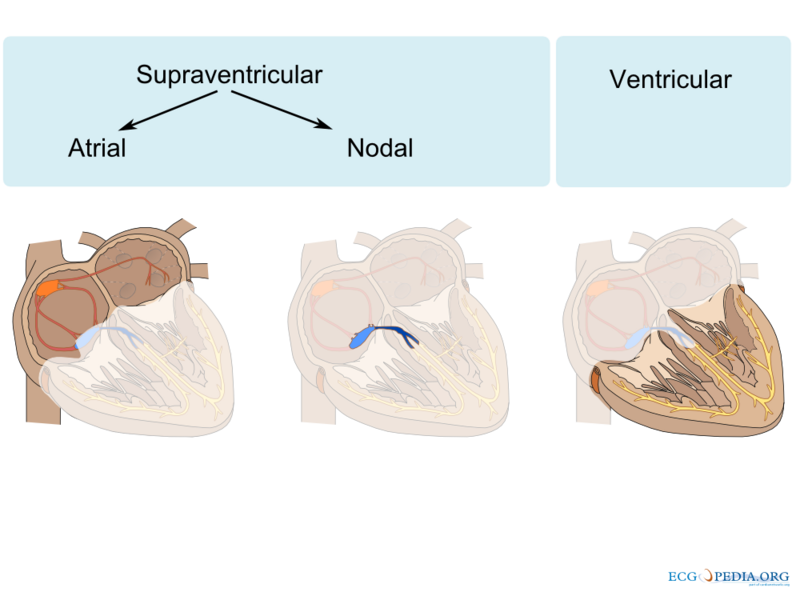
Broad classification of arrhythmias according to region of heart required to sustain the rhythm

Arrhythmia may be classified by rate (tachycardia, bradycardia), mechanism (automaticity, re-entry, triggered) or duration (isolated premature beats; couplets; runs, that is 3 or more beats; non-sustained = less than 30 seconds or sustained = over 30 seconds).

Arrhythmias are also classified by site of origin:

=== Atrial arrhythmia ===
- Sinus bradycardia
- Sinus arrhythmia
- Sinus tachycardia
- Premature atrial contractions (PACs)
- Wandering atrial pacemaker
- Atrial tachycardia
- Multifocal atrial tachycardia
- Supraventricular tachycardia (SVT)
- Atrial flutter
- Atrial fibrillation (Afib)
- AV nodal reentrant tachycardia

=== Junctional arrhythmia ===
- AV nodal reentrant tachycardia
- Junctional rhythm
- Junctional tachycardia
- Premature junctional contraction

=== Ventricular arrhythmia ===
- Premature ventricular contractions (PVCs), sometimes called ventricular extra beats (VEBs)
  - Premature ventricular beats occurring after every normal beat are termed ventricular bigeminy
  - PVCs that occur at intervals of 2 normal beats to 1 PVC, or 1 normal beat to 2 PVCs, are termed "PVCs in trigeminy"
  - Groups of three premature ventricular beats are called triplets and are considered a brief run of non-sustained ventricular tachycardia (NSVT); if the grouping lasts for more than 30 seconds, it is considered sustained ventricular tachycardia (VT).
- Accelerated idioventricular rhythm
- Monomorphic ventricular tachycardia
- Polymorphic ventricular tachycardia
- Ventricular fibrillation
- Torsades de pointes
- Arrhythmogenic right ventricular dysplasia
- Re-entry ventricular arrhythmia

=== Heart blocks ===
Heart blocks are also known as AV blocks, because the vast majority of them arise from pathology at the atrioventricular node. They are the most common causes of bradycardia:

- First-degree heart block, which manifests as PR prolongation
- Second-degree heart block
  - Type 1 Second degree heart block, also known as Mobitz I or Wenckebach
  - Type 2 Second degree heart block, also known as Mobitz II
- Third-degree heart block, also known as complete heart block

First, second, and third-degree blocks also can occur at the level of the sinoatrial junction. This is referred to as sinoatrial block typically manifesting with various degrees and patterns of sinus bradycardia.

=== Sudden arrhythmic death syndrome ===
Sudden arrhythmic death syndrome (SADS), is a term used as part of sudden unexpected death syndrome to describe sudden death because of cardiac arrest occasioned by an arrhythmia in the presence or absence of any structural heart disease on autopsy. The most common cause of sudden death in the US is coronary artery disease specifically because of poor oxygenation of the heart muscle, that is myocardial ischemia or a heart attack Approximately 180,000 to 250,000 people die suddenly of this cause every year in the US. SADS may occur from other causes. There are many inherited conditions and heart diseases that can affect young people which can subsequently cause sudden death without advance symptoms.

Causes of SADS in young people include viral myocarditis, long QT syndrome, Brugada syndrome, catecholaminergic polymorphic ventricular tachycardia, hypertrophic cardiomyopathy and arrhythmogenic right ventricular dysplasia.

=== Fetal arrhythmia ===
Arrhythmias may also occur in the fetus. The normal heart rate of the fetus is between 110 and 160 beats per minute. Any rhythm beyond these limits is abnormal and classed as a fetal arrhythmia. These are mainly the result of premature atrial contractions, usually give no symptoms, and have little consequence. However, around one percent of these will be the result of significant structural damage to the heart.

== Signs and symptoms ==
The term cardiac arrhythmia covers a very large number of very different conditions.

The most common symptom of arrhythmia is an awareness of an abnormal heartbeat, called palpitations. These may be infrequent, frequent, or continuous. Some of these arrhythmias are harmless (though distracting for patients) but some of them predispose to adverse outcomes. Arrhythmias also cause chest pain and shortness of breath.

Some arrhythmias do not cause symptoms and are not associated with increased mortality. However, some asymptomatic arrhythmias are associated with adverse events. Examples include a higher risk of blood clotting within the heart and a higher risk of insufficient blood being transported to the heart because of a weak heartbeat. Other increased risks are of embolization and stroke, heart failure, and sudden cardiac death.

If an arrhythmia results in a heartbeat that is too fast, too slow, or too weak to supply the body's needs, this manifests as lower blood pressure and may cause lightheadedness, dizziness, syncope, loss of consciousness, coma, persistent vegetative state, or brain death due to insufficient supply of blood and oxygen to the brain.

Some types of arrhythmia result in cardiac arrest, or sudden death.

Medical assessment of the abnormality using an electrocardiogram is one way to diagnose and assess the risk of any given arrhythmia.

== Mechanism ==
Cardiac arrhythmia is caused by one of two major mechanisms. The first of arrhythmia is a result of enhanced or abnormal impulse formation originating at the pacemaker or the His-Purkinje network. The second is due to re-entry conduction disturbances.

== Diagnostic ==
Cardiac arrhythmia is often first detected by simple but nonspecific means: auscultation of the heartbeat with a stethoscope, or feeling for peripheral pulses. These cannot usually diagnose specific arrhythmia but can give a general indication of the heart rate and whether it is regular or irregular. Not all the electrical impulses of the heart produce audible or palpable beats; in many cardiac arrhythmias, the premature or abnormal beats do not produce an effective pumping action and are experienced as "skipped" beats.

The simplest specific diagnostic test for assessment of heart rhythm is the electrocardiogram (abbreviated ECG or EKG). A Holter monitor is an EKG recorded over a 24-hour period, to detect arrhythmias that may happen briefly and unpredictably throughout the day.

A more advanced study of the heart's electrical activity can be performed to assess the source of the aberrant heart beats. This can be accomplished in an electrophysiology study, an endovascular procedure that uses a catheter to "listen" to the electrical activity from within the heart, additionally if the source of the arrhythmias is found, often the abnormal cells can be ablated and the arrhythmia can be permanently corrected. Transesophageal atrial stimulation (TAS) instead uses an electrode inserted through the esophagus to a part where the distance to the posterior wall of the left atrium is only approximately 5–6 mm (remaining constant in people of different age and weight). Transesophageal atrial stimulation can differentiate between atrial flutter, AV nodal reentrant tachycardia and orthodromic atrioventricular reentrant tachycardia. It can also evaluate the risk in people with Wolff–Parkinson–White syndrome, as well as terminate supraventricular tachycardia caused by re-entry.

=== Differential diagnosis ===
==== Normal electrical activity ====
Each heartbeat originates as an electrical impulse from a small area of tissue in the right atrium of the heart called the sinus node or sinoatrial node (SA node). The impulse initially causes both atria to contract, then activates the atrioventricular node (AV node), which is normally the only electrical connection between the atria and the ventricles (main pumping chambers). The impulse then spreads through both ventricles via the bundle of His and the Purkinje fibers causing a synchronized contraction of the heart muscle and, thus, the pulse.

In adults, the normal resting heart rate ranges from 60 to 90 beats per minute. The resting heart rate in children is much faster. In athletes, however, the resting heart rate can be as slow as 40 beats per minute, and be considered normal.

The term sinus arrhythmia refers to a normal phenomenon of alternating mild acceleration and slowing of the heart rate that occurs with breathing in and out respectively. It is usually quite pronounced in children and steadily decreases with age. This can also be present during meditation breathing exercises that involve deep inhaling and breath holding patterns.

==== Bradycardias ====
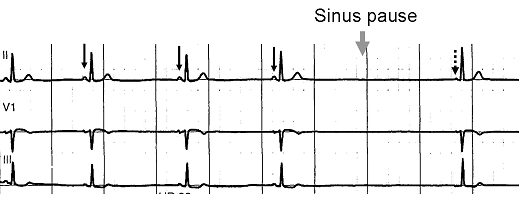
Normal sinus rhythm, with solid black arrows pointing to normal P waves representative of normal sinus node function, followed by a pause in sinus node activity (resulting in a transient loss of heartbeats). Note that the P wave that disrupts the pause (indicated by the dashed arrow) does not look like the previous (normal) P waves – this last P wave is arising from a different part of the atrium, representing an escape rhythm.

A slow rhythm (less than 60 beats/min) is labelled bradycardia. This may be caused by a slowed signal from the sinus node (sinus bradycardia), by a pause in the normal activity of the sinus node (sinus arrest), or by blocking of the electrical impulse on its way from the atria to the ventricles (AV block or heart block). Heart block comes in varying degrees and severity. It may be caused by reversible poisoning of the AV node (with drugs that impair conduction) or by irreversible damage to the node. Bradycardias may also be present in the normally functioning heart of endurance athletes or other well-conditioned persons. Bradycardia may also occur in some types of seizures.

==== Tachycardias ====
In adults and children over 15, resting heart rate faster than 100 beats per minute is labeled tachycardia. Tachycardia may result in palpitation; however, tachycardia is not necessarily an arrhythmia. Increased heart rate is a normal response to physical exercise or emotional stress. This is mediated by the sympathetic nervous system on the sinus node and called sinus tachycardia. Other conditions that increase sympathetic nervous system activity in the heart include ingested or injected substances, such as caffeine or amphetamines, and an overactive thyroid gland (hyperthyroidism) or anemia.

Tachycardia that is not sinus tachycardia usually results from the addition of abnormal impulses to the normal cardiac cycle. Abnormal impulses can begin by one of three mechanisms: automaticity, re-entry, or triggered activity. A specialized form of re-entry which is both common and problematic is termed fibrillation.

Although the term "tachycardia" has been known for over 160 years, bases for the classification of arrhythmias are still being discussed.

==== Atrial arrhythmias ====
There are 5 different atrial arrhythmias:

- Atrial fibrillation has an atrial rate of 400+ and is distinguishable due to its irregular ventricular rate and wavy deflections.
- Atrial flutter has an atrial rate of 250-400 and can be identified by p waves with saw tooth deflections.
- Paroxysmal atrial tachycardia has a regular rate, however a high rate of about 140-250 bpm, p waves are generally hidden and the PR interval is not measurable.
- Premature atrial pacemaker: has a regular underlying rhythm however there is a premature beat which can be identified by an irregular p wave with a different size, shape, and direction often found within a T wave, the PR interval is generally normal however can be hard to measure, the QRS complex is premature for the PAC, but is generally normal.
- Wandering atrial pacemaker can be either normal or irregular in rate, much like a sinus arrhythmia the rate is normally between 60 - 100 bpm when it is normal and less than 60 when it is slow, the distinguishing feature of this rhythm is a p wave that varies in size, shape, and direction, the PR interval can either be normal or irregular depending on the location of conduction of the PR interval, the QRS complex is normal.

==== Ventricular arrhythmias ====
Ventricular arrhythmias are some of the most dangerous heart rhythms requiring cardiopulmonary resuscitation (CPR) and defibrillation in cases of symptomatic ventricular tachycardia and ventricular fibrillation. There are 5 different ventricular arrhymia.

- Ventricular tachycardia is a regular rhythm with a rate of 140-250 bpm, there are no P waves and the main feature is a wide QRS complex (0.12 and greater)
- Ventricular fibrillation has no p waves or QRS complexes, there are only wavy irregular deflections throughout the heart rhythm, at this point the heart would have a rate of 0 and be supplying no blood through the body.
- Idioventricular rhythm this is a regular rhythm identifiable by a wide QRS complex with absent P waves, and a rate between 30 and 40 bpm.
- Accelerated idioventricular rhythm is a regular rhythm with a wide QRS complex and absent P waves, and a rate between 50 and 100 bpm.
- The final rhythm is ventricular standstill this rhythm will appear as a flat line, but may have a few non conducted p waves, the heart rate of this will be 0 and be supplying no blood through the body like ventricular fibrillation.

==== Heart defects ====
Congenital heart defects are structural or electrical pathway problems in the heart that are present at birth. Anyone can be affected by this because overall health does not play a role in the problem. Problems with the electrical pathway of the heart can cause very fast or even deadly arrhythmias. Wolff–Parkinson–White syndrome is due to an extra pathway in the heart that is made up of electrical muscle tissue. This tissue allows the electrical impulse, which stimulates the heartbeat, to happen very rapidly. Right ventricular outflow tract tachycardia is the most common type of ventricular tachycardia in otherwise healthy individuals. This defect is due to an electrical node in the right ventricle just before the pulmonary artery. When the node is stimulated, the patient will go into ventricular tachycardia, which does not allow the heart to fill with blood before beating again. Long QT syndrome is another complex problem in the heart and has been labeled as an independent factor in mortality. There are multiple methods of treatment for these including cardiac ablations, medication treatment, or lifestyle changes to have less stress and exercise.

==== Automaticity ====
Automaticity refers to a cardiac muscle cell firing off an impulse on its own. All of the cells in the heart have the ability to initiate an action potential; however, only some of these cells are designed to routinely trigger heartbeats. These cells are found in the conduction system of the heart and include the SA node, AV node, bundle of His, and Purkinje fibers. The sinoatrial node is a single specialized location in the atrium that has a higher automaticity (a faster pacemaker) than the rest of the heart and, therefore, is usually responsible for setting the heart rate and initiating each heartbeat.

Any part of the heart that initiates an impulse without waiting for the sinoatrial node is called an ectopic focus and is, by definition, a pathological phenomenon. This may cause a single premature beat now and then, or, if the ectopic focus fires more often than the sinoatrial node, it can produce a sustained abnormal rhythm. Rhythms produced by an ectopic focus in the atria, or by the atrioventricular node, are the least dangerous dysrhythmias; but they can still produce a decrease in the heart's pumping efficiency because the signal reaches the various parts of the heart muscle with different timing than usual and can be responsible for poorly coordinated contraction.

Conditions that increase automaticity include sympathetic nervous system stimulation and hypoxia. The resulting heart rhythm depends on where the first signal begins: If it is the sinoatrial node, the rhythm remains normal but rapid; if it is an ectopic focus, many types of dysrhythmia may ensue.

==== Re-entry ====
Re-entrant arrhythmias occur when an electrical impulse recurrently travels in a tight circle within the heart, rather than moving from one end of the heart to the other and then stopping.

Every cardiac cell can transmit impulses of excitation in every direction but will do so only once within a short time. Normally, the action potential impulse will spread through the heart quickly enough that each cell will respond only once. However, if there is some essential heterogeneity of refractory period or if conduction is abnormally slow in some areas (for example in heart damage) so the myocardial cells are unable to activate the fast sodium channel, part of the impulse will arrive late and potentially be treated as a new impulse. Depending on the timing, this can produce a sustained abnormal circuit rhythm.

As a sort of re-entry, vortices of excitation in the myocardium (autowave vortices) are considered to be the main mechanism of life-threatening cardiac arrhythmias. In particular, the autowave reverberator is common in the thin walls of the atria, sometimes resulting in atrial flutter. Re-entry is also responsible for most paroxysmal supraventricular tachycardia, and dangerous ventricular tachycardia. These types of re-entry circuits are different from WPW syndromes, which utilize abnormal conduction pathways.

Although omega-3 fatty acids from fish oil can be protective against arrhythmias, they can facilitate re-entrant arrhythmias.

==== Fibrillation ====
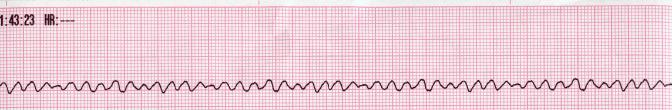
Ventricular fibrillation

When an entire chamber of the heart is involved in multiple micro-re-entry circuits and is, therefore, quivering with chaotic electrical impulses, it is said to be in fibrillation.

Fibrillation can affect the atrium (atrial fibrillation) or the ventricle (ventricular fibrillation): ventricular fibrillation is imminently life-threatening.

- Atrial fibrillation affects the upper chambers of the heart, known as the atria. Atrial fibrillation may be due to serious underlying medical conditions and should be evaluated by a physician. It is not typically a medical emergency.
- Ventricular fibrillation occurs in the ventricles (lower chambers) of the heart; it is always a medical emergency. If left untreated, ventricular fibrillation (VF, or V-fib) can lead to death within minutes. When a heart goes into V-fib, effective pumping of the blood stops. V-fib is considered a form of cardiac arrest. An affected individual will not survive unless cardiopulmonary resuscitation (CPR) and defibrillation are provided immediately.

CPR can prolong the survival of the brain in the lack of a normal pulse, but defibrillation is the only intervention that can restore a healthy heart rhythm. Defibrillation is performed by applying an electric shock to the heart, which resets the cells, permitting a normal beat to re-establish itself.

==== Triggered beats ====
Triggered beats occur when problems at the level of the ion channels in individual heart cells result in abnormal propagation of electrical activity and can lead to a sustained abnormal rhythm. They are relatively rare and can result from the action of anti-arrhythmic drugs, or after depolarizations.

== Management ==
The method of cardiac rhythm management depends firstly on whether the affected person is stable or unstable. Treatments may include physical maneuvers, medications, electricity conversion, or electro- or cryo-cautery.

In the United States, people admitted to the hospital with cardiac arrhythmia and conduction disorders with and without complications were admitted to the intensive care unit more than half the time in 2011.

=== Physical maneuvers ===
Several physical acts can increase parasympathetic nervous supply to the heart, resulting in blocking of electrical conduction through the AV node. This can slow down or stop several arrhythmias that originate above or at the AV node (see main article: supraventricular tachycardias). Parasympathetic nervous supply to the heart is via the vagus nerve, and these maneuvers are collectively known as vagal maneuvers.

=== Antiarrhythmic drugs ===
There are many classes of antiarrhythmic medications, with different mechanisms of action and many different individual drugs within these classes. Although the goal of drug therapy is to prevent arrhythmia, nearly every antiarrhythmic drug has the potential to act as a pro-arrhythmic, and so must be carefully selected and used under medical supervision.

=== Other drugs ===
Several groups of drugs slow conduction through the heart, without actually preventing an arrhythmia. These drugs can be used to "rate control" a fast rhythm and make it physically tolerable for the patient.

Some arrhythmias promote blood clotting within the heart and increase the risk of embolus and stroke. Anticoagulant medications such as warfarin and heparins, and anti-platelet drugs such as aspirin can reduce the risk of clotting.

=== Electricity ===
Arrhythmias may also be treated electrically, by applying a shock across the heart – either externally to the chest wall, or internally to the heart via implanted electrodes.

Cardioversion is either achieved pharmacologically or via the application of a shock synchronized to the underlying heartbeat. It is used for the treatment of supraventricular tachycardias. In elective cardioversion, the recipient is usually sedated or lightly anesthetized for the procedure.

Defibrillation differs in that the shock is not synchronized. It is needed for the chaotic rhythm of ventricular fibrillation and is also used for pulseless ventricular tachycardia. Often, more electricity is required for defibrillation than for cardioversion. In most defibrillation, the recipient has lost consciousness so there is no need for sedation.

Defibrillation or cardioversion may be accomplished by an implantable cardioverter-defibrillator (ICD).

Electrical treatment of arrhythmias also includes cardiac pacing. Temporary pacing may be necessary for reversible causes of very slow heartbeats, or bradycardia (for example, from drug overdose or myocardial infarction). A permanent pacemaker may be placed in situations where the bradycardia is not expected to recover.

=== Electrical cautery ===
Some cardiologists further sub-specialize into electrophysiology. In specialized catheter laboratories, they use fine probes inserted through the blood vessels to map electrical activity from within the heart. This allows abnormal areas of conduction to be located very accurately and subsequently destroyed by heat, cold, electrical, or laser probes in a process called catheter ablation.

This procedure may be completely curative for some forms of arrhythmia, but for others, the success rate remains disappointing. AV nodal reentrant tachycardia is often curable by ablating one of the pathways in the AV node (usually the slow pathway). Atrial fibrillation can also be treated, by performing a pulmonary vein isolation, but the results are less reliable.

== Research ==
Arrhythmias due to medications have been reported since the 1920s with the use of quinine. In the 1960s and 1970s problems with antihistamines and antipsychotics were discovered. It was not until the 1980s that the underlying issue, QTc prolongation was determined. Osborn waves on electrocardiogram (ECG) are frequent during targeted temperature management (TTM) after cardiac arrest, particularly in patients treated with 33 °C. Osborn waves are not associated with increased risk of ventricular arrhythmia, and may be considered a benign physiological phenomenon, associated with lower mortality in univariable analyses.

== See also ==
- Pre-excitation syndrome
- Holiday heart syndrome
