= Bigeminy =

- Other names: bigemini
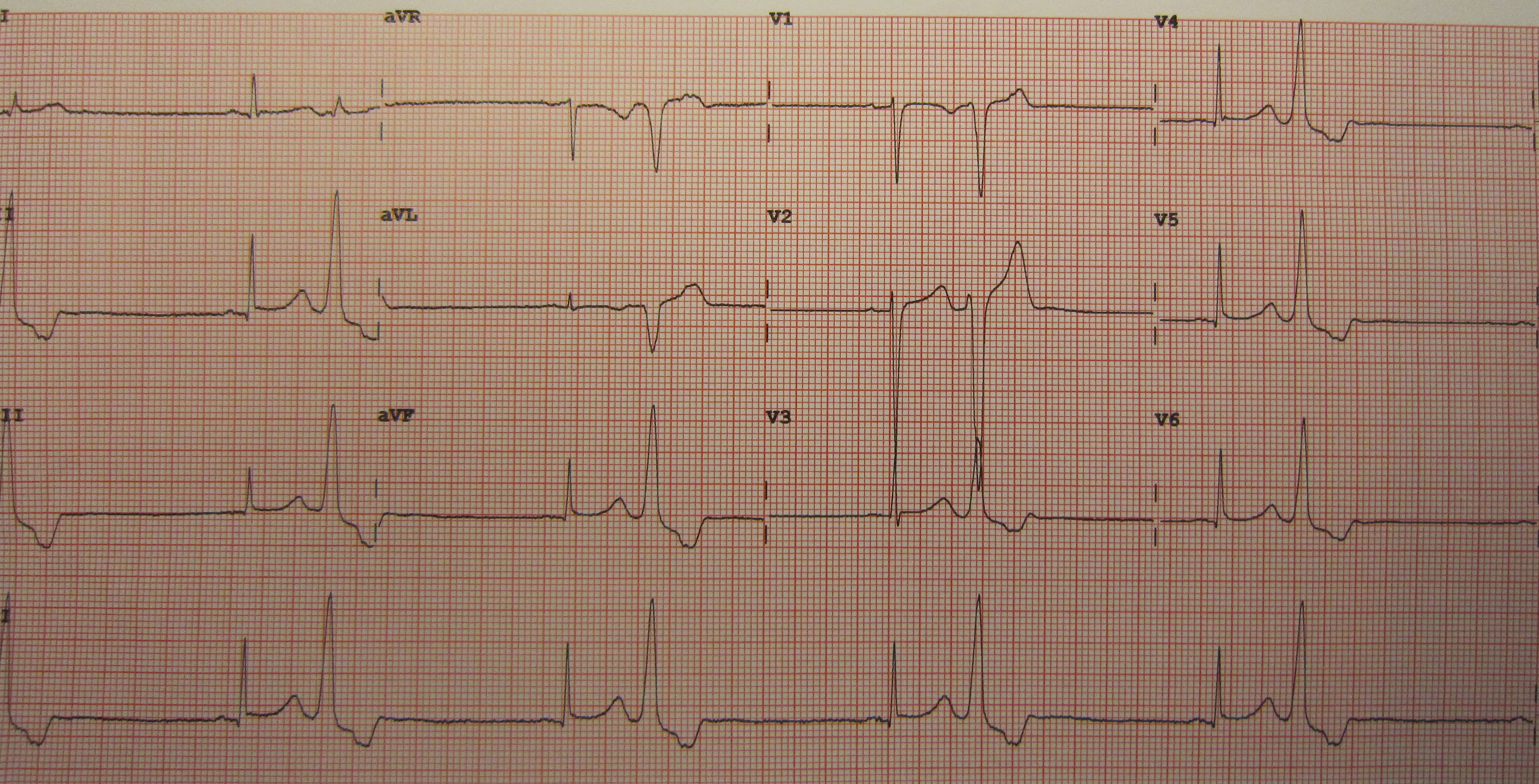
- Bigeminy as seen on a 12 lead ECG
- Pronunciation: bigeminy /baɪˈdʒɛmɪni/ or bigemini /baɪˈdʒɛmɪˌnaɪ/

Bigeminy is a cardiac arrhythmia in which there is a single ectopic beat, or irregular heartbeat, following each regular heartbeat. Most often this is due to ectopic beats occurring so frequently that there is one after each sinus beat, or normal heartbeat. The two beats are figuratively similar to two twins (hence bi- + gemini). For example, in ventricular bigeminy, a sinus beat is shortly followed by a premature ventricular contraction (PVC), a pause, another normal beat, and then another PVC. In atrial bigeminy, the other "twin" is a premature atrial contraction (PAC).

== Cause ==
After any premature ventricular contraction there is a pause that can lead to the development of bigeminy. A PVC wavefront often encounters a refractory AV node that does not conduct the wavefront retrograde. Thus the atrium is not depolarized and the sinus node is not reset. Since the sinus P wave to PVC interval is less than the normal P–P interval, the interval between the PVC and the next P wave is prolonged to equal the normal time elapsed during two P–P intervals. This is called a "compensatory" pause. The pause after the PVC leads to a longer recovery time, which is associated with a higher likelihood of myocardium being in different stages of repolarization. This then allows for re-entrant circuits and sets up the ventricle for another PVC after the next sinus beat. The constant interval between the sinus beat and PVC suggests a reentrant etiology rather than spontaneous automaticity of the ventricle.

Premature atrial contractions by contrast do not have a compensatory pause, since they reset the sinus node, but atrial or supraventricular bigeminy can occur. If the PACs are very premature, the wavefront can encounter a refractory AV node and not be conducted. This can be mistaken for sinus bradycardia if the PAC is buried in the T wave since the PAC will reset the SA node and lead to a long P–P interval.

Hypothyroidism has been reported as a potential cause of cardiac arrhythmias, including bigeminy, as the autonomic instability and changes to cardiac contractility observed in a hypothyroid state may contribute to their development.

== Diagnosis ==
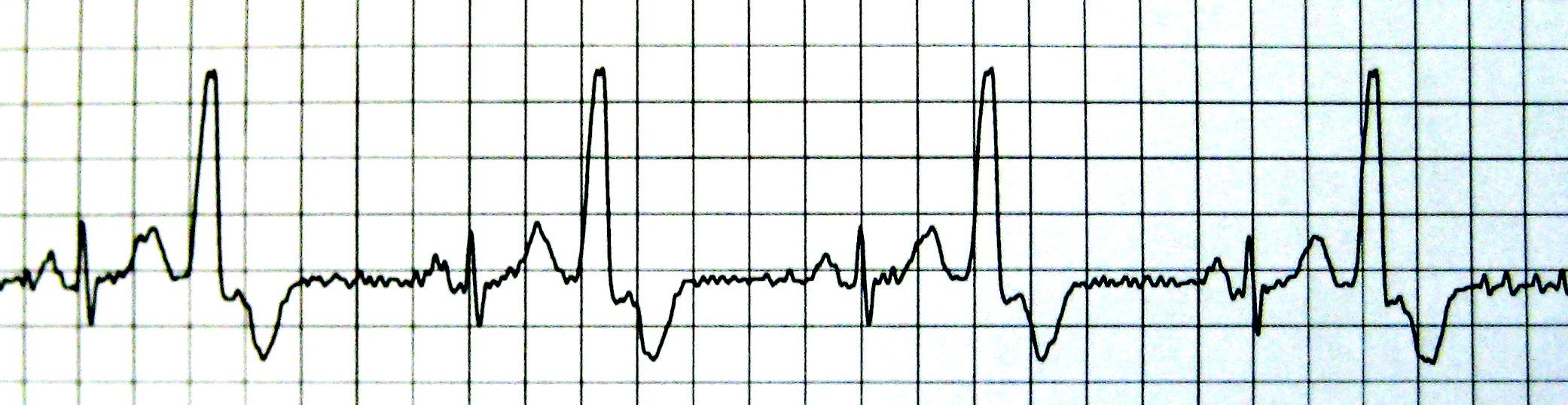
A rhythm strip demonstrating bigeminy

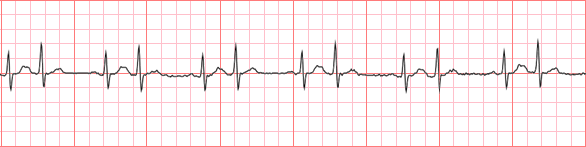
Simple ECG of a supraventricular bigeminy

=== Rule of bigeminy ===
When the atrial rhythm is irregular (as in atrial fibrillation or sinus arrhythmia) the presence of bigeminy depends on the length of the P–P interval and happens more frequently with a longer interval. As with post PVC pauses, a longer P–P interval leads to a higher chance of re-entrant circuits and thus PVCs. The term "rule of bigeminy" is used to refer to the dependence of bigeminy on the ventricular cycle length in irregular rhythms.

=== Classification ===
There can be similar patterns depending on the frequency of abnormal beats. If every other beat is abnormal, it is described as bigeminal. If every third beat is aberrant, it is trigeminal; every fourth would be quadrigeminal. Typically, if every fifth or more beat is abnormal, the aberrant beat would be termed occasional.

Bigeminy is contrasted with couplets, which are paired abnormal beats. Groups of three abnormal beats are called triplets and are considered a brief run of non-sustained ventricular tachycardia (NSVT), and if the grouping lasts for more than 30 seconds, it is ventricular tachycardia (VT).

== Treatment ==
In people without underlying heart disease and who do not have any symptoms, bigeminy in itself does not require any treatment. If it does become symptomatic, beta-blockers can be used to try to suppress ventricular ectopy. Class I and III agents are generally avoided as they can provoke more serious arrhythmias.
