= Sinoatrial arrest =

- Other names: Sinuatrial arrest, sinus arrest, sinus pause
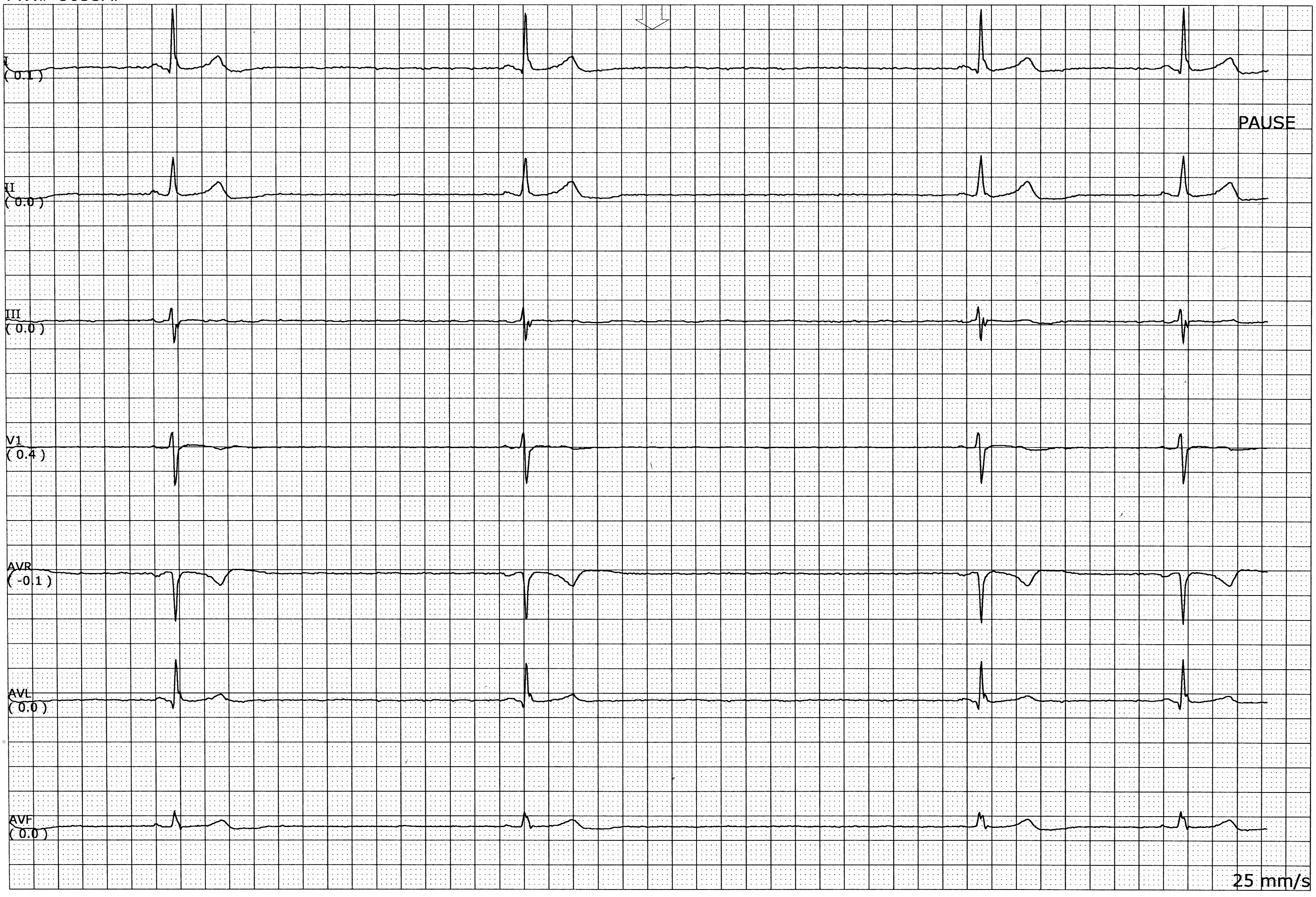
- Telemetry monitor rhythm strip of a patient with sinus arrest, secondary to COVID 19
- Specialty: Cardiology

Sinoatrial arrest is a medical condition wherein the sinoatrial node of the heart transiently ceases to generate the electrical impulses that normally stimulate the myocardial tissues to contract and thus the heart to beat. It is defined as lasting from 2.0 seconds to several minutes. Since the heart contains multiple pacemakers, this interruption of the cardiac cycle generally lasts only a few seconds before another part of the heart, such as the atrio-ventricular junction or the ventricles, begins pacing and restores the heart action. This condition can be detected on an electrocardiogram (ECG) as a brief period of irregular length with no electrical activity before either the sinoatrial node resumes normal pacing, or another pacemaker begins pacing. If a pacemaker other than the sinoatrial node is pacing the heart, this condition is known as an escape rhythm. If no other pacemaker begins pacing during an episode of sinus arrest it becomes a cardiac arrest. This condition is sometimes confused with sinoatrial block, a condition in which the pacing impulse is generated, but fails to conduct through the myocardium. Differential diagnosis of the two conditions is possible by examining the exact length of the interruption of cardiac activity. If the next available pacemaker takes over, it is in the following order:

- Atrial escape (rate 60–80): originates within atria, not sinus node (normal P morphology is lost).
- Junctional escape (rate 40–60): originates near the AV node; a normal P wave is not seen, may occasionally see a retrograde P wave.
- Ventricular escape (rate 20–40): originates in ventricular conduction system; no P wave, wide, abnormal QRS.

Treatment includes stop medications that suppress the sinus node (beta blocker, calcium channel blocker, digitalis); may need pacing.
