= Wandering atrial pacemaker =

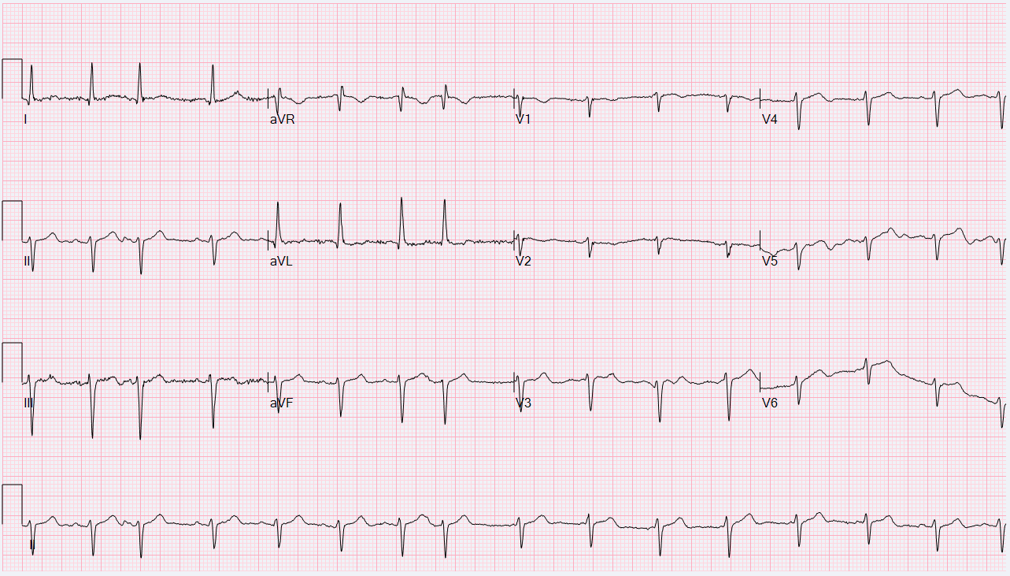
- ECG showing differing P-wave morphologies
- Specialty: Cardiology

Wandering atrial pacemaker (WAP) is an atrial rhythm where the pacemaking activity of the heart originates from different locations within the atria. This is different from normal pacemaking activity, where the sinoatrial node (SA node) is responsible for each heartbeat and keeps a steady rate and rhythm. Causes of wandering atrial pacemaker are unclear, but there may be factors leading to its development. It is often seen in the young, the old, and in athletes, and rarely causes symptoms or requires treatment. Diagnosis of wandering atrial pacemaker is made by an ECG.

== Pathophysiology ==
The SA node is considered the primary pacemaker of the heart. In wandering atrial pacemaker, there are other locations within the atria besides the SA node that are responsible for each heartbeat. This is unusual because the SA node, AV node, bundle of His, bundle branches, and Purkinje fibers are the structures that have pacemaking capability. The atrial and ventricular muscle tissue do not have this capability.

Originally, it was believed that the atria had different ectopic foci that were spontaneously depolarizing, each foci acting as a pacemaker for the heart. However, the atrial muscle tissue isn't able to spontaneously depolarize. Therefore, the mechanism is by extension of the self-depolarizing tissue between the SA and AV node. Over time, the extension of tissue becomes a tract with spontaneous depolarization capability. This allows for any location along the tract to spontaneously depolarize, hence different locations that are responsible for each heartbeat.

== Causes ==
Wandering atrial pacemaker may be seen in young, healthy individuals as well as in the elderly and those with lung disease. The cause of wandering atrial pacemaker is unclear.

Increased tone from the vagus nerve may factor into the rhythm appearing in young, healthy individuals who exercise. The vagus nerve is a part of the parasympathetic nervous system that helps control heart rate and contractility of the heart. Through exercise, there is increased input to the heart from the vagus nerve, which causes the heart to beat at a slower rate. This is manifested by a lower resting heart rate than may be seen in the average person. For elderly individuals, the rhythm may be caused by sinus node dysfunction. This is where the heart's pacemaker, the SA node, has become damaged. For individuals with lung disease, the rhythm could be related to the underlying lung pathology. In rare cases, digoxin toxicity can cause wandering atrial pacemaker.

== Symptoms ==
Wandering atrial pacemaker doesn't usually have symptoms because it is commonly a benign rhythm. It is usually found incidentally on an ECG for other medical indications that require a heart rhythm screening. If a patient does have symptoms, it may manifest as skipped heartbeats. Upon physical examination, it can be found by having an irregularly irregular rhythm, similar to how atrial fibrillation is described. An ECG would then be performed to find the underlying cause of the rhythm disturbance.

== Diagnosis ==
The heart rhythm is seen through an electrocardiogram. To make the diagnosis, there must be at least 3 different P-wave morphologies in a single ECG lead due to the shifting of the pacemaker in the atria. This is different from normal sinus rhythm where one will see the same P-wave morphology through the same lead because each beat is started from the SA node. The P-wave is normally upright or positive in leads I and II, and therefore may be the helpful when determining changing P-wave morphologies. Other common changes that are seen on ECG with wandering atrial pacemaker include differing PR intervals and PP intervals.

Another heart rhythm similar to wandering atrial pacemaker is multifocal atrial tachycardia. Both arrhythmias have at least 3 different P-wave morphologies in a single ECG lead, but the heart rate is different. When the heart rate is lower than 100 beats per minute, the heart rhythm is considered wandering atrial pacemaker. When the heart rate is greater than 100 beats per minute, the heart rhythm is considered multifocal atrial tachycardia.

== Treatment ==
Treatment is rarely required because, in most cases, it is asymptomatic. If symptoms develop, medication can be pursued for symptomatic relief. In the setting of suspected sinus node dysfunction manifesting as wandering atrial pacemaker, evaluation for pacemaker placement may be done due to sinus node damage. In cases of digoxin toxicity, a physician may decrease the dose, change medications, or cease digoxin therapy.
