= Premature junctional contraction =

Premature heartbeat

Premature junctional contractions (PJCs), also called atrioventricular junctional premature complexes or junctional extrasystole, are premature cardiac electrical impulses originating from the atrioventricular node of the heart or "junction". This area is not the normal but only a secondary source of cardiac electrical impulse formation. These premature beats can be found occasionally in healthy people and more commonly in some pathologic conditions, typically in the case of drug cardiotoxicity, electrolyte imbalance, mitral valve surgery, and cold water immersion. If more than two such beats are seen, then the condition is termed junctional rhythm. On the surface ECG, premature junctional contractions will appear as a normally shaped ventricular complex or QRS complex, not preceded by any atrial complex or P wave or preceded by an abnormal P wave with a shorter PR interval. Rarely, the abnormal P wave can follow the QRS.

== See also ==
- Premature atrial contraction
- Premature ventricular contraction
