= Sinoventricular conduction =

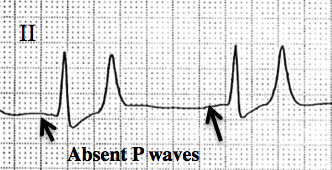
ECG demonstrating sinoventricular conduction due to hyperkalemia

Sinoventricular conduction is a rare form of cardiac conduction in which the sinoatrial node generates an impulse that is conducted to the atrioventricular node (AV node) in the absence of the right atrium contracting. This is the physiological proof for the presence of the internodal tracts, which have not been clearly demonstrated histologically. On electrocardiogram (ECG), there will be no P wave due to the inactivation of the atrial muscles.

Hyperkalemia can lead to sinoventricular conduction, as evidenced on ECG by the P waves becoming flatter and flatter and eventually disappearing. The impulse from the sinus node is still conducted via the internodal tracts to the AV node, and thus normal ventricular activation occurs. Sinoventricular conduction has also been demonstrated during acute myocardial ischemia. This has been further elucidated by the absence of P waves in any surface leads despite effective high right atrial pacing.
