= Premature heart beat =

Medical condition

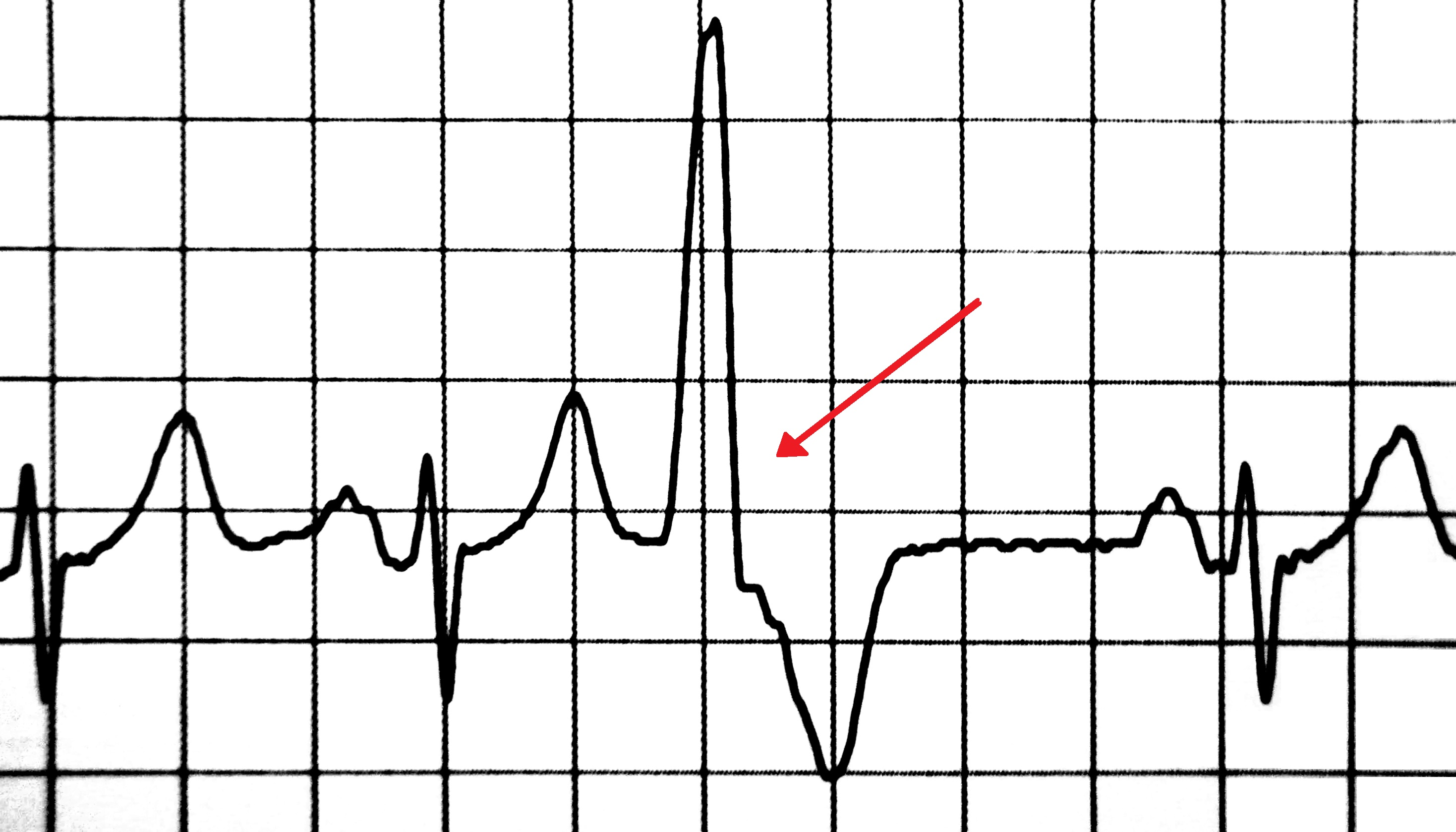
- A premature ventricular contraction marked by the arrow
- Specialty: Cardiology

Emma's irregular heartbeat
Heart sounds of a 15 year old girl experiencing premature heart beats. Recorded during recovery after running, with the stethoscope over her tricuspid valve. Her heart rhythm is very irregular, with many premature ventricular contractions heard.

A premature heart beat (also called extrasystole or "extra beat") is a heart rhythm disorder corresponding to a premature contraction of one of the chambers of the heart. Premature heart beats come in two different types: premature atrial contractions and premature ventricular contractions. Often they cause no symptoms but may present with fluttering in the chest or a skipped beat. They typically have no long-term complications.

They most often happen naturally but may be associated with caffeine, nicotine, or stress. Usually no treatment is needed. They are the most common arrhythmia.

== Physiopathology ==
The normal heart contraction comes from a cyclic membrane depolarization (reversal of the electrical polarity of the cell membrane) of a group of cells located on the upper part of the right atrium, the sinoatrial node. This depolarization spreads to the whole heart and causes muscle cells to contract. It is followed by a "refractory period", a short time when the cells are no longer stimulable. The heart rate is controlled by this node.

== Diagnosis ==
Premature heart beat revealed by laser Doppler imaging by digital holography of the eye fundus

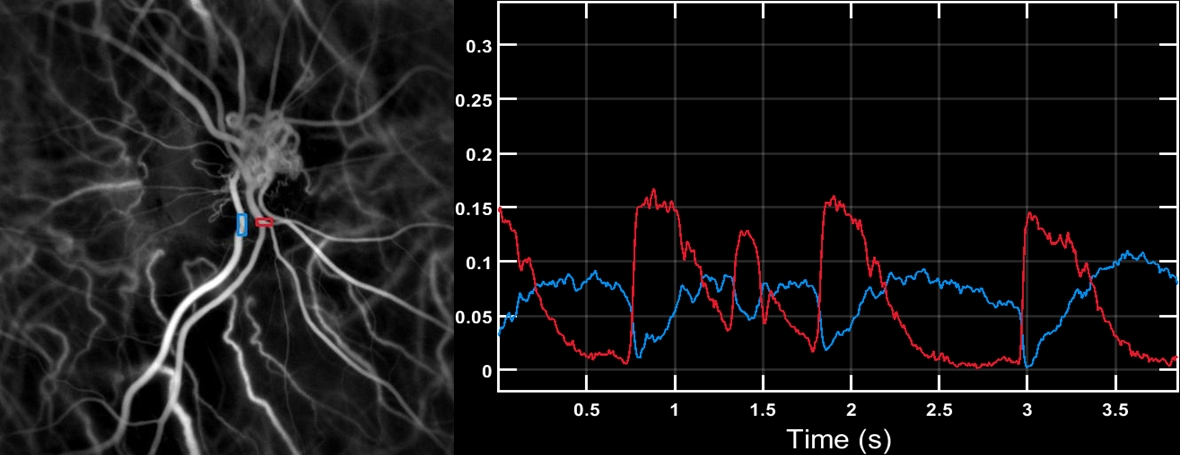
Premature heart beat revealed by blood flow pulse wave in the central retinal artery (red) and vein (blue) by laser Doppler imaging.

Premature heart beats can be asymptomatic (the patient does not complain about anything). The subject may experience palpitations, a feeling of cardiac "pause". Taking (prolonged) pulse may result in a rhythm that seems irregular. Electrocardiography and laser Doppler imaging allow to visualize premature heart beats. From their appearance, their location can be assessed. The Holter monitor allows to quantify them, to specify their characteristics and their repetition.

== Types ==
- Premature atrial contraction (PAC)
  - Supraventricular extrasystoles (SVES)
- Premature ventricular contraction (PVC)
  - Ventricular extrasystoles (VES)
- Premature junctional contraction
