= Idioventricular rhythm =

Type of cardiac rhythm

An idioventricular rhythm is a cardiac rhythm characterized by a rate of <50 beats per minute (bpm), absence of conducted P waves and widening of the QRS complex. In cases where the heart rate is between 50 and 110 bpm, it is known as accelerated idioventricular rhythm and ventricular tachycardia if the rate exceeds 120 bpm. Causes of idioventricular rhythms are varied and can include drugs or a heart defect at birth. It is typically benign and not life-threatening.

== Etiology ==
Various etiologies may contribute to the formation of an idioventricular rhythm, and include:

- Heart block
- Reperfusion after myocardial infarction
- Electrolyte abnormalities
- Heart diseases present at birth
- Certain drugs (eg. digoxin, β-agonists, anaesthetics)

== Pathophysiology ==
The physiological pacemaker of the heart is the sinoatrial node. If the sinoatrial node is rendered dysfunctional, the AV node may act as the pacemaker. If both of these fail, the ventricles begin to act as the dominant pacemaker in the heart. The ventricles acting as their own pacemaker gives rise to an idioventricular rhythm.

== Diagnosis ==
An ECG trace is required for diagnosis.

== Treatment ==
As this rhythm is not life-threatening, treatment has limited value for the patient. If underlying pathologies are identified, they should be treated appropriately. In the absence of other life-threatening arrhythmias, antiarrhythmics should be avoided as they can blunt the ventricular rate leading to hemodynamic collapse.
