= Ectopic beat =

Cardiac arrhythmia

- Other names: Cardiac ectopy
- Normal sinus rhythm and ectopic beats – premature ventricular contractions (PVC) and premature atrial contractions (PAC) shown on an EKG
- Specialty: Cardiology

Ectopic beat is a disturbance of the cardiac rhythm frequently related to the electrical conduction system of the heart, in which beats arise from fibers or group of fibers outside the region in the heart muscle ordinarily responsible for impulse formation (i.e., the sinoatrial node).

An ectopic beat can be further classified as:

- Premature heart beat

- premature ventricular contraction (PVC)
- premature atrial contraction (PAC)

- Escape beat, when the sinoatrial node becomes abnormally delayed, to the point where ectopic fibers become faster at initiating an impulse

- Junctional escape beat
- Ventricular escape beat

Some patients describe this experience as a "flip" or a "jolt" in the chest, or a "heart hiccup", while others report dropped or missed beats. Ectopic beats are more common during periods of psychological stress, exercise or debility; they may also be triggered by consumption of some food like carbohydrates, strong cheese, or chocolate.

It is a form of cardiac arrhythmia in which ectopic foci within either ventricular or atrial myocardium, or from finer branches of the electric transduction system, cause additional beats of the heart. Some medications may worsen the phenomenon.

Ectopic beats are considered normal and are not indicative of cardiac pathology. Ectopic beats often remain undetected and occur as part of minor errors in the heart conduction system. They are rarely indicative of cardiac pathology, although may occur more frequently or be more noticeable in those with existing cardiac abnormalities. Ectopic beats are a type of cardiac arrhythmias, which is a variety of cardiac abnormalities relating to rate or rhythm of the cardiac cycle.

Ectopic beats may become more frequent during anxiety, panic attack, and the fight-or-flight response due to the increase in sympathetic nervous activity or due to parasympathetic failure, stimulating either more frequent or more vigorous contractions and increasing stroke volume. The consumption of nicotine, alcohol, epinephrine and caffeine may also increase the incidence of ectopic beats, due to their influence on the action of cardiomyocytes.

== See also ==
- Heart arrhythmia § Origin of impulse
- Ectopia (disambiguation)
- Junctional escape beat
- Palpitation
- Premature junctional contraction
- Ventricular escape beat
