= Ectopia =

Ectopia, ectopic, or ectopy may refer to:

- Ectopia (medicine), including a list of medical uses of ectopia or ectopic
  - Ectopic pregnancy, a pregnancy that occurs outside the uterus
  - Ectopic beat, or cardiac ectopy, a disturbance in cardiac rhythm
- Ectopia (album), by Steroid Maximus, 2002
- Ectopic Entertainment, a record label
- Ectopia, a 2014 novel by Martin J. Goodman

== See also ==
- Ecotopia (disambiguation)
