= Junctional tachycardia =

Abnormally fast heartbeat, the cause of which involves the atrioventricular node

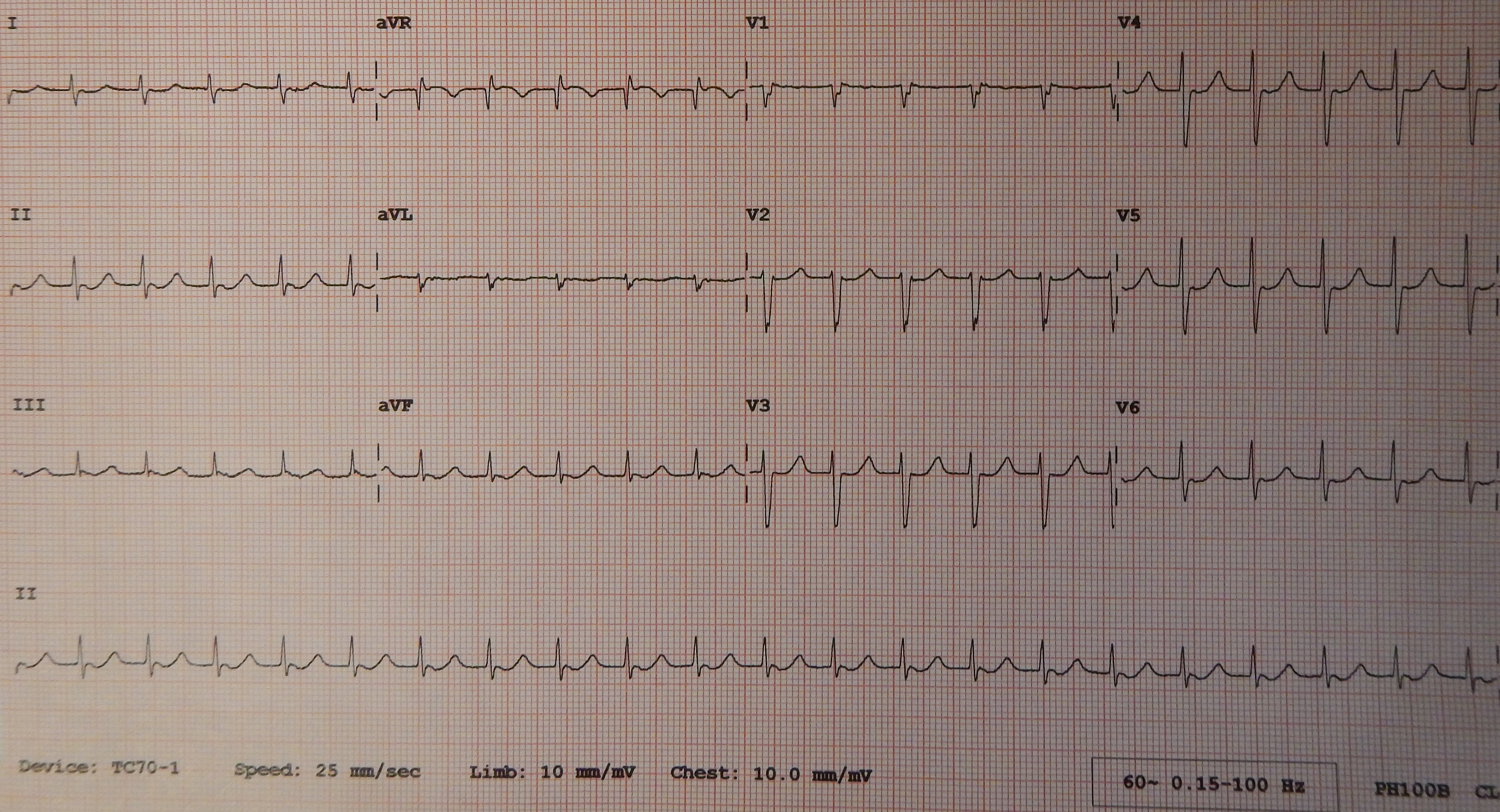
- ECG showing junctional tachycardia. Narrow complex QRS. No P waves. Heart rate fast.
- Treatment: Amiodarone to control the rhythm, electrical cardioversion is not used.

Junctional tachycardia is a form of supraventricular tachycardia characterized by involvement of the AV node. It can be contrasted to atrial tachycardia. It is a tachycardia associated with the generation of impulses in a focus in the region of the atrioventricular node due to an A-V disassociation. In general, the AV junction's intrinsic rate is 40-60 bpm so an accelerated junctional rhythm is from 60-100bpm and then becomes junctional tachycardia at a rate of >100 bpm.

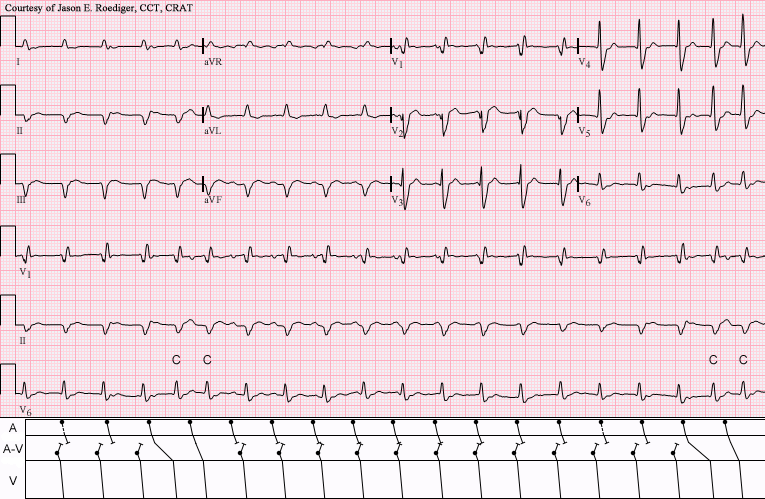
Junctional tachycardia (rate about 115/min) dissociated from a slightly slower sinus tachycardia (rate about 107/min) producing one form of double tachycardia; pairs of ventricular capture (C) beats (5th, 6th, 19th, and 20th beats); see laddergram.

== Cause ==
It can be associated with digitalis toxicity. It may also be due to onset of acute coronary syndrome, heart failure, conduction system diseases with enhanced automaticity, or administration of theophylline.

== Diagnosis ==
On an EKG, junctional tachycardia exhibits the following classic criteria:

- P-Waves: The p-wave may be inverted in leads II, III and aVF or may not be visible
- Narrow QRS complexes (which is consistent with arrhythmias that conduct through the ventricles using the His-Purkinje system and often originate from the atria or AV junction.)

It can coexist with other superventricular tachycardias due to the disassociation between the SA node and the AV node.

Forms of junctional tachycardia include junctional ectopic tachycardia (JET) and atrioventricular nodal re-entrant tachycardia (AVNRT) which can be distinguished by performing electrophysiological studies.

== Treatment ==
Amiodarone is used to control the rhythm. Electrical cardioversion is not used.

== See also ==
- Junctional rhythm
