= Heart cell =

Heart cell may refer to:

- Cardiomyocyte, a heart muscle cell
- Cardiac pacemaker cell
