= Proarrhythmic agent =

A Pro-arrhythmic agent is a chemical, drug, or food that promotes cardiac arrhythmias.

== Substances ==
=== Supplements ===
Omega 3 fatty acids.

=== Foods ===
Chocolate, Coffee, Tea

=== Drugs ===
Caffeine, cocaine, beta-adrenergic agonists

Encainide, Lorcainide

== See also ==
- Antiarrhythmic agent
- Electrophysiology study
