= Ecotopia (disambiguation) =

Ecotopia is a 1975 novel by Ernest Callenbach.

Ecotopia may also refer to:

- Ecotopia (album), a 1987 album by American jazz group Oregon
- Ecotopia gathering, or simply Ectopia, a training camp for the European Youth For Action
- A non-profit environmental organization headed by Srđa Popović
- A restaurant opened by South Korean writer Hur Aram
- A fictional place in the TV series seaQuest; see List of seaQuest characters § Adversaries
- Ecotopia, one of The Nine Nations of North America, as defined by Joel Garreau

== See also ==
- Ectopia (disambiguation)
- Utopia (disambiguation)
