= Premature atrial contraction =

Skipped beat with atrial origin

- Other names: Supraventricular extra systole (SVES), supraventricular ectopy (SVE)
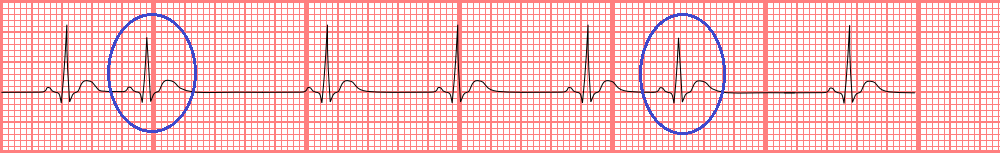
- Two PACs with a compensatory pause seen on an ECG rhythm strip. A "skipped beat" occurs and rhythm resumes 2 P-to-P intervals after the last normal sinus beat.
- Specialty: Cardiology, electrophysiology

A premature atrial contraction (PAC), also known as atrial premature complex (APC) or atrial premature beat (APB), is a common arrhythmia characterized by premature heartbeats originating in the atria. While the sinoatrial node typically regulates the heartbeat during normal sinus rhythm, PACs occur when another region of the atria depolarizes before the sinoatrial node and thus triggers a premature heartbeat, in contrast to escape beats, in which the normal sinoatrial node fails, leaving a non-nodal pacemaker to initiate a late beat.

The exact cause of PACs is unclear; while several predisposing conditions exist, single isolated PACs commonly occur in healthy young and elderly people. Elderly people that get PACs usually don't need any further attention besides follow-ups due to unclear evidence.

PACs are often completely asymptomatic and may be noted only with Holter monitoring, but occasionally they can be perceived as a skipped beat or a jolt in the chest. In most cases, no treatment other than reassurance is needed for PACs, although medications such as beta blockers can reduce the frequency of symptomatic PACs.

== Epidemiology ==
Premature atrial contractions (PACs) are common in the general population, and increase with age. Over 99% of individuals in the general population will have at least one PAC in a 24-hour period. Many PACs can indicate increased risk of atrial fibrillation and/or ischemic stroke. The threshold for number of PACs which substantially raises the risk atrial fibrillation is debatable, but some estimates range between in excess of 500 and 720 PACs per day.

== Risk factors ==
Hypertension, or abnormally high blood pressure, often signifies an elevated level of both psychological and physiological stress. Often, hypertension goes hand in hand with various atrial fibrillations, including PACs. Additional factors that may contribute to spontaneous premature atrial contractions could be:

- Increased age
- Abnormal body height
- Family history of heart disease
- History of cardiovascular disease (CV)
- Abnormal atrial natriuretic peptide (ANP) levels
- Elevated cholesterol

== Diagnosis ==
Normal sinus rhythm and ectopic beats - premature ventricular contractions (PVC) and premature atrial contractions (PAC) shown on an EKG

Premature atrial contractions are typically diagnosed with an electrocardiogram, Holter monitor, long-term continuous monitor, cardiac event monitor, or with a smartwatch with an ECG functionality.

=== Electrocardiogram ===
On an electrocardiogram (ECG), PACs are characterized by an abnormally shaped P wave in different ECG leads. Since the premature beat initiates outside the sinoatrial node, the associated P wave appears different from those seen in normal sinus rhythm. Typically, the atrial impulse propagates normally through the atrioventricular node and into the cardiac ventricles, resulting in a normal, narrow QRS complex. However, if the atrial beat is premature enough, it may reach the atrioventricular node during its refractory period, in which case it will not be conducted to the ventricle and there will be no QRS complex following the P wave.

In some people, PACs occur in a predictable pattern. Two PACs in a row are called doublets and three PACs in a row are triplets. Depending whether there are one, two, or three normal (sinus) beats between each PACs, the rhythm is called atrial bigeminy, trigeminy, or quadrigeminy. If three or more consecutive PACs occur in a row and at a frequency of 100 or more beats per minute, it may be called atrial tachycardia.

== Treatment ==
Premature atrial contractions are often benign, requiring no treatment. Occasionally, the patient having the PAC will find these symptoms bothersome, in which case the doctor may treat the PACs. Sometimes the PACs can indicate heart disease or an increased risk for other cardiac arrhythmias. In this case, the underlying cause is treated. Often a beta blocker will be prescribed for symptomatic PACs.

== Prognosis ==
In otherwise healthy patients, occasional single premature atrial contractions are a common finding and most of times do not indicate any particular health risk. Rarely, in patients with other underlying structural heart problems, PACs can trigger a more serious arrhythmia such as atrial flutter or atrial fibrillation. In otherwise healthy people, PACs usually disappear with adolescence.

== Supraventricular extrasystole ==
A supraventricular extrasystole (SVES) is an extrasystole or premature electrical impulse in the heart, generated above the level of the ventricle. This can be either a premature atrial contraction or a premature impulse from the atrioventricular node. SVES should be viewed in contrast to a premature ventricular contraction that has a ventricular origin and the associated QRS change. Instead of the electrical impulse beginning in the sinoatrial (SA) node and propagating to the atrioventricular (AV) node, the signal is conducted both to the ventricle and back to the SA node where the signal began.

== See also ==
- Premature junctional contraction
- Premature ventricular contraction
