= Re-entry ventricular arrhythmia =

- Specialty: Cardiology

Re-entry ventricular arrhythmia is a type of paroxysmal tachycardia occurring in the ventricle where the cause of the arrhythmia is due to the electric signal not completing the normal circuit, but rather an alternative circuit looping back upon itself. There develops a self-perpetuating rapid and abnormal activation. ("Circus Movement" is another term for this.) Conditions necessary for re-entry include a combination of unidirectional block and slowed conduction. Circus movement may also occur on a smaller scale within the AV node (dual AV nodal physiology), a large bypass tract is not necessary.

Re-entry is divided into two major types: [Anatomically Defined] re-entry and [Functionally Defined] re-entry. The circus movement can occur around an anatomical or functional core. Either type may occur alone, or together.

Anatomically defined re-entry has a fixed anatomic pathway. Anomalous conduction via accessory pathways (APs) creates the re-entry circuit (which are also called bypass tracts), that exists between the atria and ventricles. Wolff–Parkinson–White syndrome (WPW) is an example of anatomically defined re-entry. WPW syndrome is an atrioventricular re-entrant tachycardia (AVRT), secondary to an accessory pathway that connects the epicardial surfaces of the atrium and ventricle along the AV groove. The majority of time symptomatic WPW fits the definition of AVRT (Supraventricular tachycardia) however AVNRT (dual AV nodal physiology) exist in ~10% of patients with WPW syndrome creating the possibility of spontaneous atrial fibrillation degenerating into ventricular fibrillation (VF). The fact that WPW patients are young and do not have structural heart disease, lead to using catheter ablation of the APs with the elimination of the atrial fibrillation as well as the episodes of re-entrant ventricular tachycardia. This elimination of the atrial fibrillation with ablation implies APs have some pathophysiologic role in the development of a-fib in the WPW patient.

Functionally defined re-entry does not require the alternative anatomically defined circuit accessory pathways and it may not reside in just one location. Ventricular fibrillation (VF) following ventricular tachycardia (VT) may be described as a functionally defined re-entry problem caused by multiple mini re-entrant circuits spontaneously created within the ventricular myocardium. The original re-entrant circuit breaks down into multiple mini reentrant circuits. (VF becoming the grand finale of a single prolonged VT larger circus movement, propagating change in the "functional core" of the ventricular myocardium, dissipating mini reentrant circuits, exhibited as ventricular fibrillation.) Ischemia, electrolyte, pH abnormalities, or bradycardia are potential causes of functionally defined re-entry due to changes in the properties of the cardiac tissue's functional core. (No accessory pathway required). For reentry to occur, the path length of circuit should be greater than the wave length (ERP × conduction velocity) of impulse.

== See also ==
- AV reentrant tachycardia
- AV nodal reentrant tachycardia
