= Sinus node dysfunction =

- Other names: Sick sinus syndrome or sinoatrial node disease
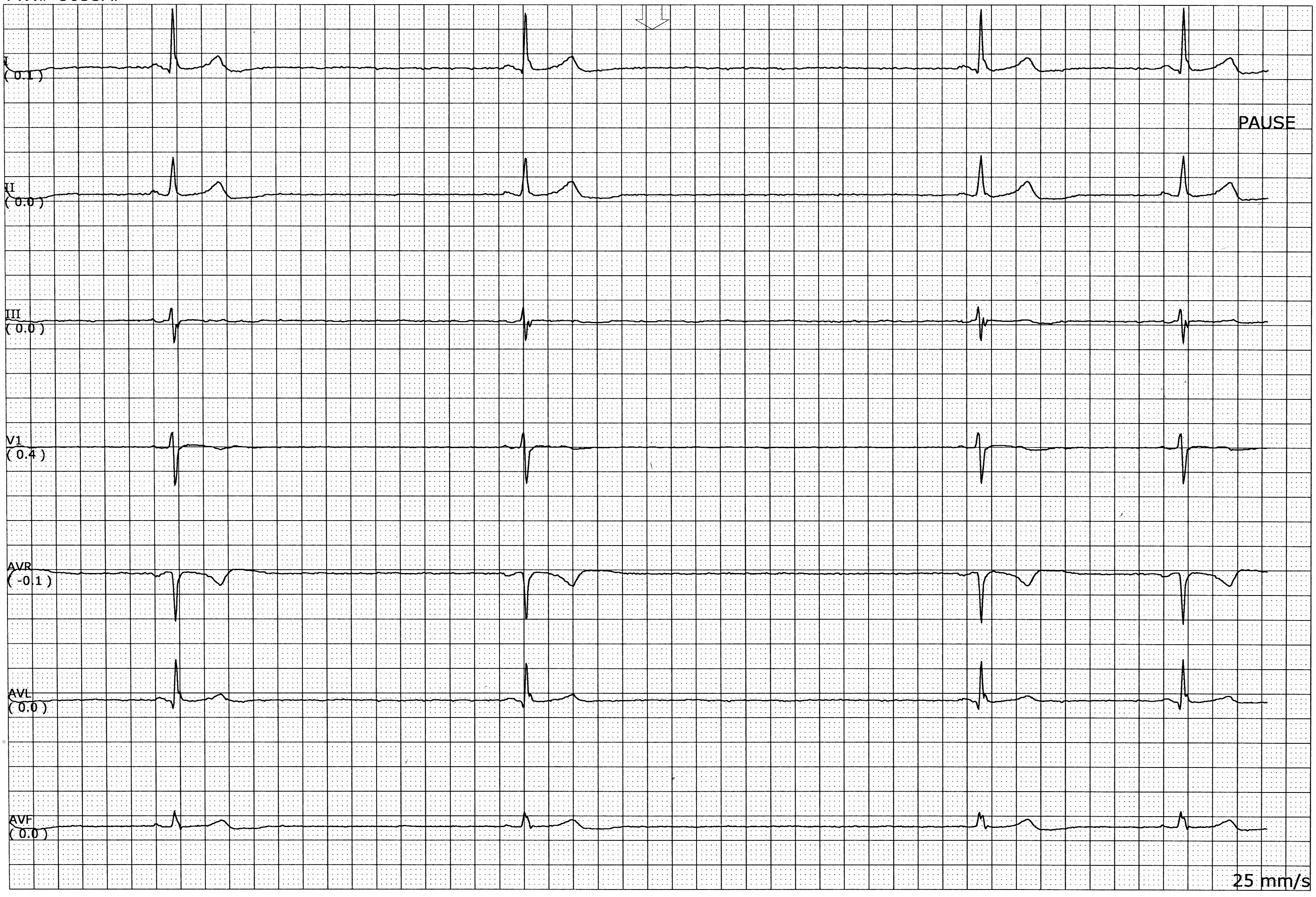
- Telemetry strip of a 44-year-old female with asymptomatic sinus pause found while admitted for mildly symptomatic COVID-19 pneumonia.
- Complications: Tachycardia-bradycardia syndrome
- Diagnostic method: electrocardiogram
- Treatment: Pacemaker implantation

Sinus node dysfunction (SND), also known as sick sinus syndrome (SSS), is a group of abnormal heart rhythms (arrhythmias) usually caused by a malfunction of the sinus node, the heart's primary pacemaker. Tachycardia-bradycardia syndrome is a variant of sick sinus syndrome in which the arrhythmia alternates between fast and slow heart rates.

== Signs and symptoms ==
Often sinus node dysfunction produces no symptoms, especially early in the disease course. Signs and symptoms usually appear in more advanced disease and more than 50% of patients will present with syncope or transient near-fainting spells as well as bradycardias that are accompanied by rapid heart rhythms, referred to as tachycardia-bradycardia syndrome Other presenting signs or symptoms can include confusion, fatigue, palpitations, chest pain, shortness of breath, headache, and nausea. Patients can also present with symptoms of congestive heart failure, stroke or transient ischemic attacks due to the abnormal rhythm.

=== Complications ===
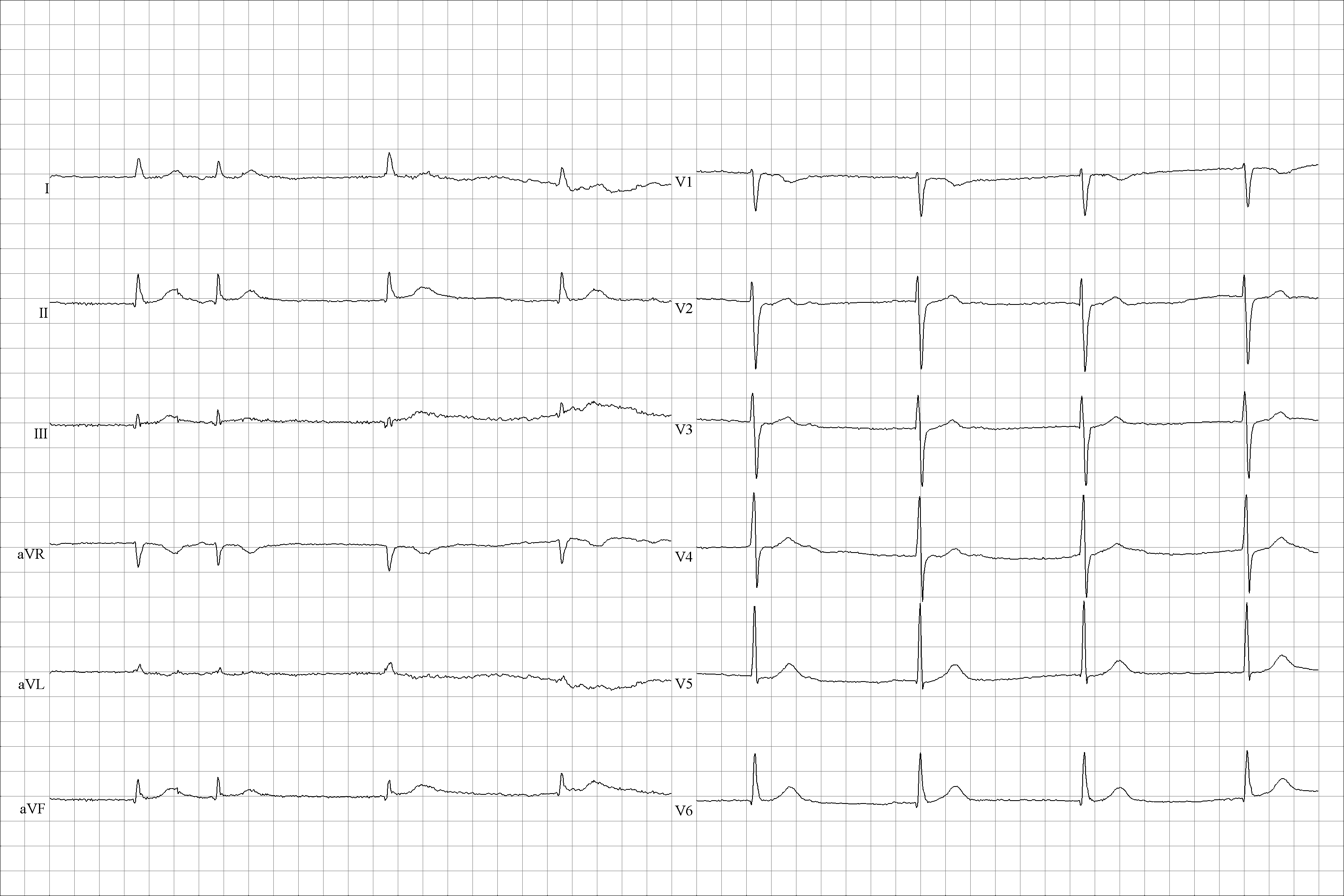
Electrocardiogram from a man with tachycardia-bradycardia syndrome following mitral valvuloplasty, resection of the left atrial appendage, and maze procedure. The ECG shows AV-junctional rhythm resulting in bradycardia at around 46 beats per minute.

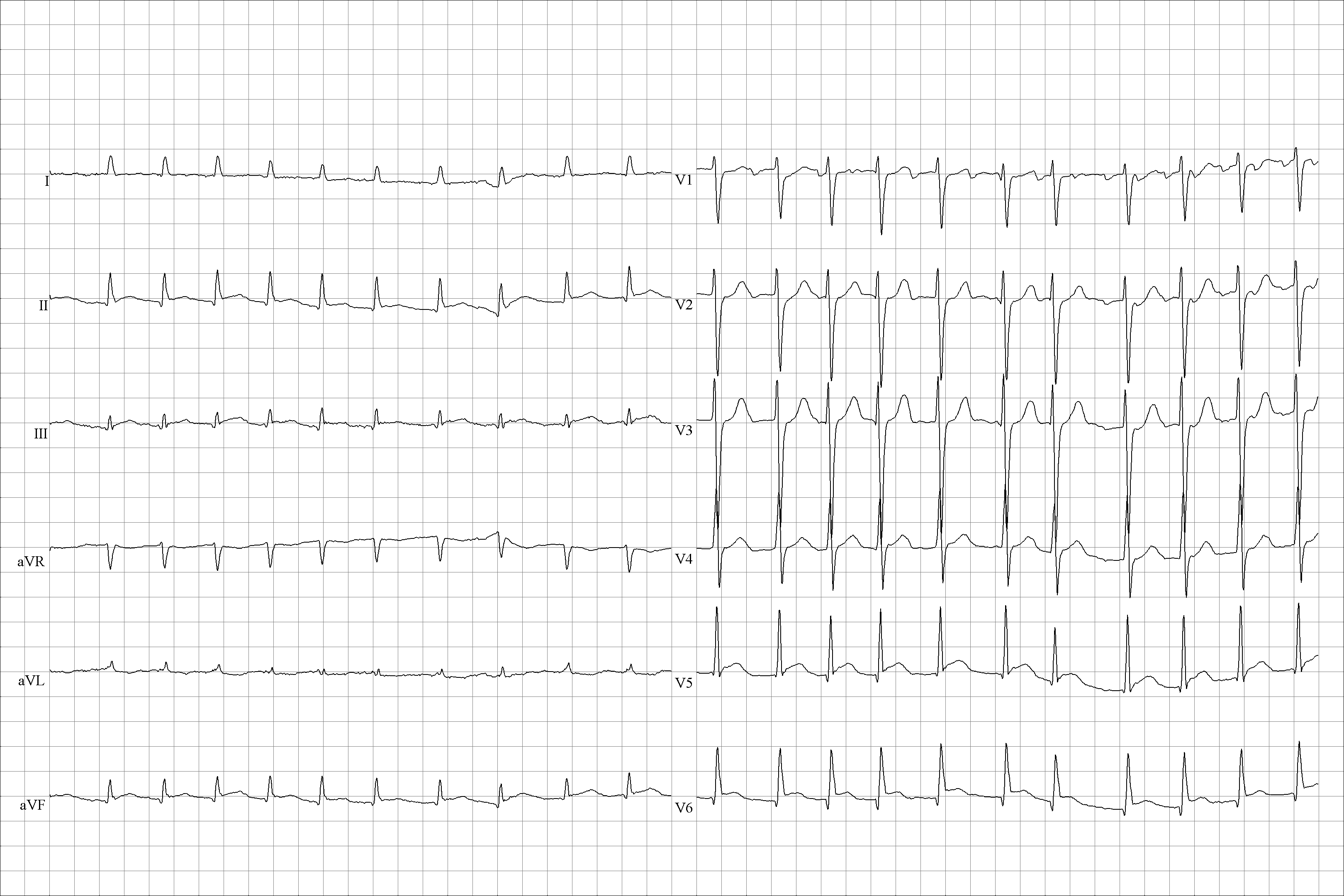
This ECG from the same patient shows atrial fibrillation at around 126 beats per minute.

The most common complication of sinus node dysfunction is the development of tachycardia-bradycardia syndrome with abnormal atrial rhythms such as atrial tachycardia, atrial fibrillation, and flutter. These rhythms increases the risk of clot formation in the atrium, embolization, and stroke.

Developing sinus arrest, sinus node exit block, sinus bradycardia, atrioventricular block, and other types of abnormal rhythms are also common complications. Sinus node dysfunction has a close association with the presence of atrial fibrillation due to their shared etiology of remodeling.

== Causes ==
Sinus node dysfunction can be caused by intrinsic and extrinsic factors that affect the normal functioning of the sinus node. Intrinsic causes can include degeneration, dysfunction, or remodeling of the sinus node while extrinsic causes can create or worsen underlying atrial arrhythmias. Intrinsic causes tend to be responsible for permanent sinus node dysfunction while extrinsic causes are more commonly temporary.

=== Intrinsic causes ===
Age-related degenerative fibrosis of the sinus node is often identified as the most common intrinsic cause. Other intrinsic causes include inherited ion channel dysfunctions, remodeling diseases such as heart failure and atrial fibrillation, infiltrative diseases such as sarcoidosis, amyloidosis, hemochromatosis, and connective tissue diseases, inflammatory etiology such as rheumatic fever, Chagas disease, and Lyme disease, as well as atherosclerotic and ischemic changes to the sinus node artery.

Inherited sinus node dysfunction has been associated with mutations of the gene responsible for the formation of the alpha subunit of the sodium channel (SCN5A).

=== Extrinsic causes ===
Common cardiac pharmacology such as beta-blockers, calcium channel blockers, digoxin, sympatholytic medication, and other antiarrhythmics can alter sinus node function to create an arrhythmia such as sick sinus syndrome. Electrolyte abnormalities such as hyperkalemia, hypokalemia, and hypocalcemia can also alter normal sinus node functioning. Hypothyroidism, hypoxia, hypothermia, and various toxins have also been associated with sinus node dysfunctions.

== Diagnosis ==
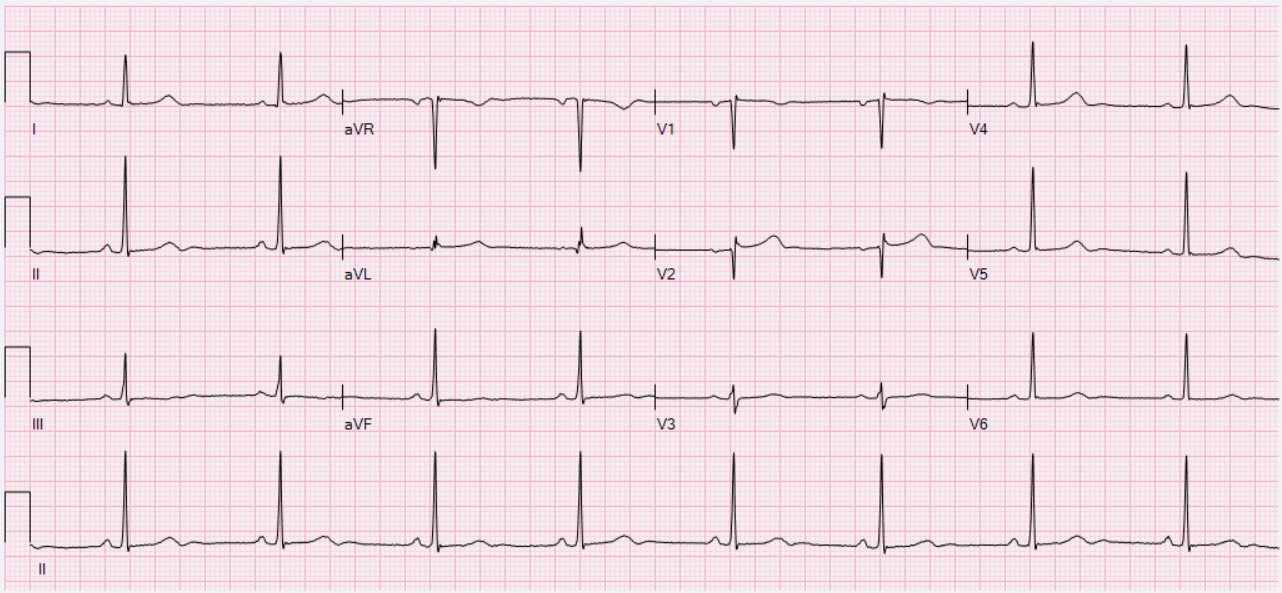
Electrocardiogram (ECG) of a 64-year-old female with sinus bradycardia. Heart rate 49 bpm.

=== Electrocardiogram ===
The primary 12-lead electrocardiogram (ECG) finding in sinus node dysfunction is inappropriate sinus bradycardia. Sinus node dysfunction can also present with sudden sinus arrest with or without junctional escape, sinoatrial block, prolonged asystolic period followed by tachycardias, or tachycardia-bradycardia syndrome presenting as various atrial arrhythmias such as atrial fibrillation, flutter, tachycardia, or paroxysmal supraventricular tachycardia.

=== Clinical diagnosis ===
Diagnosing sinus node dysfunction requires clinical symptoms as well as ECG abnormalities. If ECG findings cannot be identified, prolonged cardiac monitoring should be pursued either with a Holter monitor in an outpatient setting or telemetry while inpatient, due to the transient nature of abnormal ECG findings. If Holter or telemetry monitoring fails to identify ECG changes and suspicion of sinus node dysfunction remains high due to severe symptoms or episodes of syncope, implantable loop recorders should be considered for extended monitoring up to 24 months.

Exercise stress tests can be utilized to identify intrinsic causes of sinus node dysfunction. Tilt table tests can be used to discriminate bradycardia caused by dysfunction of the autonomic nervous system.

== Treatment ==
The primary reason for considering treatment is the presence of symptoms. Pacemaker implantation is the primary treatment modality of symptomatic sinus node dysfunction. The goal of this treatment modality is to relieve symptoms associated with sinus node dysfunction and improve quality of life. Dual chamber pacemakers are preferred due to the possibility of developing atrioventricular block as well as long term cost-effectiveness relative to single-chamber atrial pacemakers.

In tachycardia-bradycardia syndrome, medication-based management can treat atrial tachyarrhythmias. However, these medications may exacerbate underlying bradyarrhythmia. Therefore, a dual-chamber pacemaker capable of managing atrial tachyarrhythmias as well as bradyarrhythmias is implanted before drug therapy is begun.

== Epidemiology ==
Overall incidence of sinus node dysfunction increases with age with 1 in 1000 in adults over 45 years old and 1 in 600 cardiac patients over 65 years old. Sinus node dysfunction is the primary indication for approximately 30%-50% of all pacemaker implantation in the United States. Sinus node dysfunction is a relatively uncommon syndrome in the young and middle-aged population.
