= Junctional escape beat =

- Specialty: Cardiology

A junctional escape beat is a delayed heartbeat originating not from the atrium but from an ectopic focus somewhere in the atrioventricular junction. It occurs when the rate of depolarization of the sinoatrial node falls below the rate of the atrioventricular node. This dysrhythmia also may occur when the electrical impulses from the SA node fail to reach the AV node because of SA or AV block. It is a protective mechanism for the heart, to compensate for the SA node no longer handling the pacemaking activity, and is one of a series of backup sites that can take over pacemaker function when the SA node fails to do so. It can also occur following a premature ventricular contraction or blocked premature atrial contraction.

== Signs and symptoms ==
Junctional rhythms (if a bradycardia) can cause decreased cardiac output. Therefore, the person may exhibit signs and symptoms similar to other bradycardia such as lightheadedness, dizziness, low blood pressure, and fainting. This rhythm can usually be tolerated if the rate is above 50 beats per minute.

== Cause ==
A junctional escape complex is a normal response that may result from excessive vagal tone on the SA node (e.g. digoxin toxicity), a pathological slowing of the SA discharge, or a complete AV block.

== Diagnosis ==
- Rate: 35–60 bpm
- Rhythm: Irregular in single junctional escape complex; regular in junctional escape rhythm.
- P waves: Depends on the site of the ectopic focus. They will be inverted, and may appear before or after the QRS complex, or they may be absent, hidden by the QRS.
- P-R interval: If the P wave occurs before the QRS complex, the interval will be less than 0.12 seconds.
- QRS Complex: Usually normal in duration and morphology, less than 0.12 seconds.

== See also ==
- Ectopic beat
- Junctional rhythm
