= Junctional rhythm =

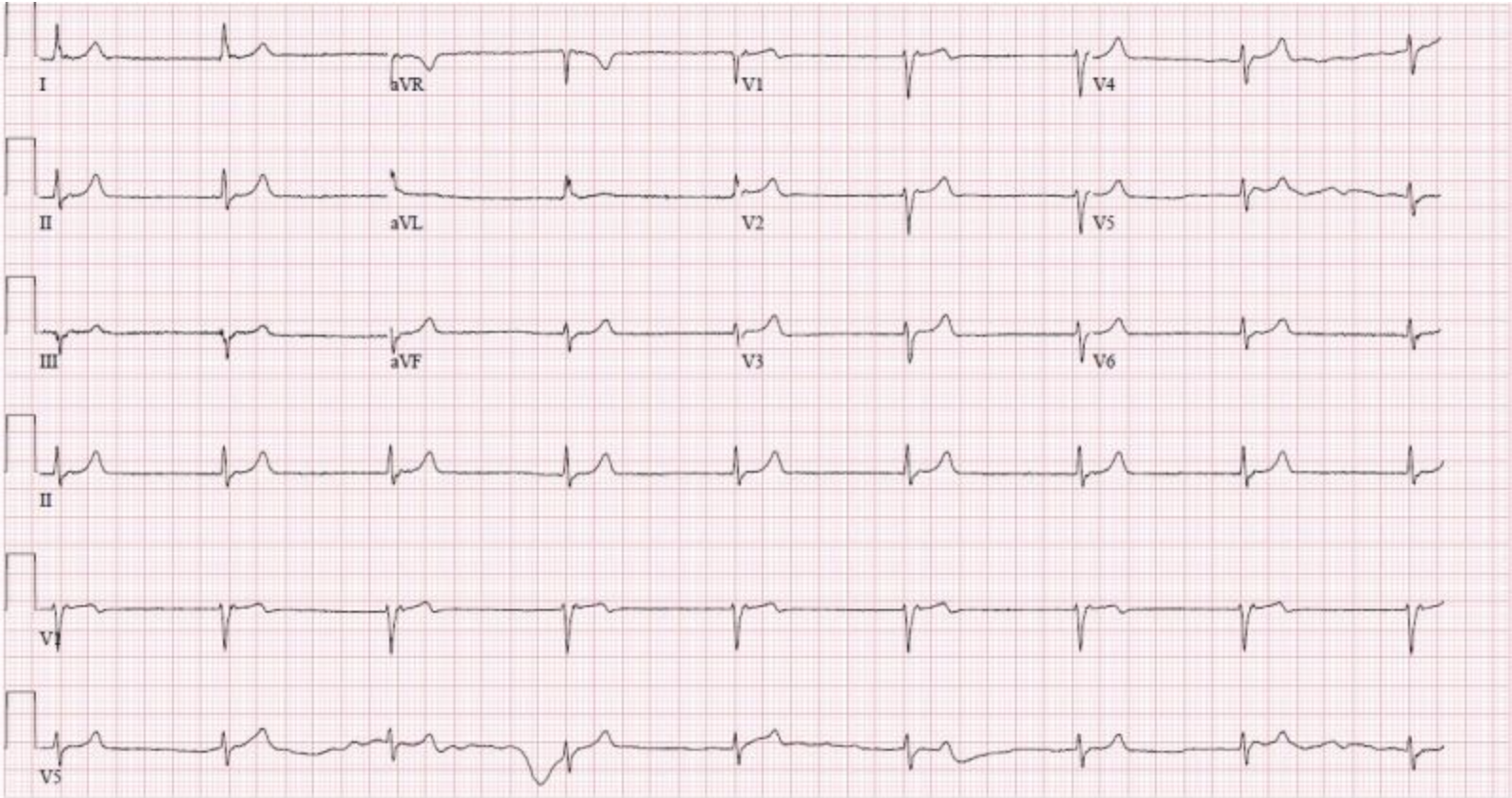
- ECG of junctional rhythm
- Specialty: Cardiology Cardiology/electrophysiology
- Symptoms: Dizziness, shortness of breath
- Complications: AV blocks
- Usual onset: After myocardial infarction (heart attack), myocarditis, hypothyroidism
- Duration: More 200ms PR interval
- Types: 1st, 2nd, and 3rd degree block
- Causes: as above
- Diagnostic method: ECG
- Differential diagnosis: 1st, 2nd, and 3rd degree heart block
- Prevention: Treat the cause, avoid triggers
- Treatment: Varies based on underlying cause
- Medication: Atropine
- Prognosis: Depends on cause
- Frequency: Depends on severity
- Deaths: Secondary to heart blocks, myocarditis, and secondary complications

Junctional rhythm, also called nodal rhythm describes an abnormal heart rhythm resulting from impulses coming from a locus of tissue in the area of the atrioventricular node (AV node), the "junction" between atria and ventricles.

Under normal conditions, the heart's sinoatrial node (SA node) determines the rate by which the organ beats – in other words, it is the heart's "pacemaker". The electrical activity of sinus rhythm originates in the sinoatrial node and depolarizes the atria. Current then passes from the atria through the atrioventricular node and into the bundle of His, from which it travels along Purkinje fibers to reach and depolarize the ventricles. This sinus rhythm is important because it ensures that the heart's atria reliably contract before the ventricles, ensuring as optimal stroke volume and cardiac output.

In junctional rhythm, however, the sinoatrial node does not control the heart's rhythm – this can happen in the case of a block in conduction somewhere along the pathway described above, or in sick sinus syndrome, or many other situations. When this happens, the heart's atrioventricular node or bundle of His can take over as the pacemaker, starting the electrical signal that causes the heart to beat. Depending on where the rhythm originates in the AV node, the atria can contract before ventricular contraction due to retrograde conduction, during ventricular contraction, or after ventricular contraction. If there is a blockage between the AV node and the SA node, the atria may not contract at all.

Junctional rhythm can be diagnosed by looking at an ECG: it usually presents without a P wave or with an inverted P wave. Retrograde, or inverted, P waves refers to the depolarization from the AV node back towards the SA node.

== Classification ==
=== Junctional bradycardia ===
Junctional bradycardia is a rhythm that still originates in the AV node or bundle of His, but simply beats at a rate less than 40 beats per minute.

=== Junctional escape rhythm ===
Junctional escape rhythm is a rhythm that still originates in the AV node or bundle of His, but beats at the intrinsic automaticity of the AV node, between 40 and 60 beats per minute.

=== Accelerated junctional rhythm ===
Accelerated junctional rhythm is when the rhythm of emerged impulses is more than 40 to 60 beats per minute, which is the natural range of the junction. It happens in some instances such as digoxin toxicity, and usually has a rate of between 60 and 100 bpm.

=== Junctional tachycardia ===
Junctional tachycardia is a rhythm that still originates in the AV node or bundle of His, but simply beats at a rate above 100 beats per minute.

== Presentation ==
The presentation and symptoms a patient can present with are varied and often dependent on the underlying cause of the junctional rhythm. Patients can be asymptomatic for example, or experience difficulty breathing and chest pain if they have underlying congestive heart failure. Other nonspecific findings include dizziness, fatigue, palpitations, and passing out. This diagnosis is made via ECG.

== Causes ==
Anything that impairs the SA node can potentially lead to a junctional rhythm. Some examples below:

- Chest trauma
- Ischemic heart disease
- Sick sinus syndrome
- Myocarditis
- Hypothyroidism
- Hyperkalemia
- Muscular dystrophy
- Certain medications
- Other neuromuscular disorders

== Diagnosis ==
=== ECG findings ===
The first finding is that junctional rhythms are regular rhythms. This means that the time interval between beats stays constant. The next normal finding is a normal QRS. Since the impulse still travels down the bundle of His, the QRS will not be wide. Junctional rhythms can present with either bradycardia, a normal heart rate, or tachycardia. The most obvious abnormal finding will be abnormal P waves. One of three options can occur:

1. There are no P waves. This is because of either failure of retrograde flow to the atria or the P wave is hidden in the QRS. If the P wave is hidden that implies the atria depolarize at the same time as the ventricles.
2. There are inverted P waves prior to the QRS complex. This is because of retrograde flow to the atria causing depolarization prior to the ventricular contraction. Since the depolarization is occurring in the opposite direction, the P wave deflection is inverted.
3. There are inverted P waves after the QRS complex. This is because of retrograde flow to the atria after ventricular contraction.

== Treatment ==
Pacemaker

== Epidemiology ==
Junctional rhythm is seen equally in men and women, and can be seen intermittently in young children and athletes, especially during sleep. It occurs commonly in patients with sinus node dysfunction. 1/600 cardiology patients over the age of 65 have sinus node dysfunction.

== See also ==
- Junctional tachycardia
- Junctional escape beat
