= Ectopic pacemaker =

Cardiac condition

- Other names: Ectopic focus, ectopic foci
- An illustration of ectopic foci near papillary muscles in the left ventricle
- Specialty: Electrophysiology, Cardiology
- Symptoms: Isolated ectopic beats; Feeling faint; Palpitations

An ectopic pacemaker, also known as ectopic focus or ectopic foci, is a group of excitable cells that causes a premature heart beat known as an ectopic beat, outside the normally functioning SA node of the heart. It is thus a cardiac pacemaker that is ectopic, producing an ectopic beat. Acute occurrence is usually non-life-threatening, but chronic occurrence can progress into tachycardia, bradycardia or ventricular fibrillation. In a normal heart beat rhythm, the SA node usually suppresses the ectopic pacemaker activity due to the higher impulse rate of the SA node. However, in the instance of either a malfunctioning SA node or an ectopic focus bearing an intrinsic rate superior to SA node rate, ectopic pacemaker activity may take over the natural heart rhythm. This phenomenon (an intrinsically slower pacemaker activity being unmasked by failure of faster pacemaker tissue 'upstream') is called an escape rhythm, the lower rhythm having escaped from the dominance of the upper rhythm. As a rule, premature ectopic beats (i.e. with a shorter than the prevailing preceding R-R' interval) indicate increased myocyte or conducting tissue excitability, whereas late ectopic beats (i.e. with a prolonged preceding R-R' interval) indicate proximal pacemaker or conduction failure with an escape 'ectopic' beat.

== Signs and symptoms ==
- Isolated ectopic beats frequently cause no symptoms, although the most common symptom is the perception of a 'missed beat'. This occurs because the person notices the prolonged gap between the early (ectopic) beat and the next normal beat.
- Palpitations
- Feeling faint

== Cause ==
Ectopic pacemakers can occur within healthy hearts in response to various stimulating events, they can be caused by automaticity or triggered activity, such as:

- Increased local parasympathetic nervous system activity
- Elevated sympathetic nervous system output
- Overstimulation from drugs such as caffeine, digitalis, and catecholamines
- Cardiac Ischemia (particularly ventricular ischemia) – the membranes of apoptotic (dying) cells become "leaky" and cause surrounding tissue to become hyperkalemic or hypercalcemic (high concentration of potassium/calcium), causing random excitation.

They can also occur within unhealthy hearts, caused by:

- Infection
- Disease, such as sinus venosus and atrial defects
- Sinus node dysfunction (1st degree block) which can cause the rate of impulse to slow
- SA node blockage so that impulses never leave the atria
- AV node blockage (3rd degree block) prevents normal conduction across ventricles

== Physiology ==
An ectopic pacemaker can reside within a part of the electrical conduction system of the heart, or within the muscle cells of the atria or ventricles. When an ectopic pacemaker initiates a beat, premature contraction occurs. A premature contraction will not follow the normal signal transduction pathway, and can render the heart refractory or incapable of transmitting the normal signal from the SA node. Location of the pacemaker can also change its effect on the SA node and its rhythm. An ectopic pacemaker located in the atria is known as an atrial pacemaker and can cause the atrial contraction to be faster. An ectopic pacemaker situated near the AV node and the septum is known as a junctional pacemaker. The pacemaker that is operating in the ventricles is known as the ventricular. Other such ectopic pacemakers can even lie within the pulmonary vein and thoracic vein walls.

== Diagnosis ==
On an ECG, the QRS complex will be abnormally shaped when looking at ventricular ectopic activity, often it occurs earlier with an absent P wave. It can be perceived as a skipped beat on both the ECG and through normal pulse-taking. During atrial ectopic activity where the P wave is normally rounded can be inverted or peaked. However the QRS complex and T waves appear relatively normal. Conversely, during junctional ectopic activity the P wave is frequently absent or can be hidden in the QRS complex.

== See also ==
- Clinical cardiac electrophysiology
