= List of cardiologists =

This is a list of people notable in the field of cardiology. Presented along with their year of birth, death, nationality, notability, and reference(s).

== Cardiologists ==
Name	Birth	Death	Nationality	Notes	Reference(s)
Maude Abbott	1869	1940	Canada		
Robert Adams	1791	1875	Ireland		
Anthony Adducci	1937	2006	United States	Inventor of the world's first lithium battery powered artificial pacemaker.	
Raymond Perry Ahlquist	1914	1983	United States		
John Ainsworth	1957	–	British	Treating complex heart conditions	
Karl Albert Ludwig Aschoff	1866	1942	Germany		
John Brereton Barlow	1924	2008	South Africa	First described mitral valve prolapse (also called Barlow's syndrome)	
Christiaan Neethling Barnard	1922	2001	South Africa	Cardiac surgeon who performed the world's first human-to-human heart transplant operation	
Fernando Antonio Bermúdez Arias	1933	2007	Venezuela		
Barouh Berkovits	1926	2012	Czechoslovakia	Pioneered cardiac defibrillators and pace makers	
Richard N. Fogoros			United States		
Werner Forssmann	1904	1979	Germany	1929 first cardiac catheterization	
Michel Haïssaguerre	1955		France		
Roland Hetzer	1944		Germany	Founder of Deutsches Herzzentrum Berlin	
Mark Josephson	1943		United States	Published "Clinical Cardiac Electrophysiology: Techniques and Interpretations,"	
Geza de Kaplany	1926		Hungary	Murdered his wife in August 1962. Received life imprisonment.	
Antonio Fernós-Isern	1895	1974	Puerto Rico	Was the "first" Puerto Rican cardiologist and a former Resident Commissioner of Puerto Rico	
Mario R. García Palmieri	1927	2014	Puerto Rico	Was given the title Master of the American College of Cardiology (M.A.C.C.), an honor given to a maximum three cardiologists in practice each year.	
Mervyn Gotsman	1935		South Africa	Was chairman of the cardiology department at Hadassah Medical Center in Jerusalem for 27 years.	
Andreas Gruentzig	1939	1985	German/American	Performed first balloon angioplasty.	
Max Holzmann	1899	1994			
Murray S. Hoffman	1924	2018	United States	Chief of Cardiology at National Jewish Hospital and then went into private practice in Denver, Colorado, President of the National Mayo Alumni Association, Member of the Board of Trustees of the American College of Cardiology, President of the Colorado Heart Association, retired from private practice and joined the faculty at the University of Colorado Medical Center. As President of the Colorado Heart Association, he founded one of the early jogging programs promoting heart health.	
J. Willis Hurst	1920	2011	United States	Cardiologist of former U.S. President Lyndon B. Johnson. Editor of Hurst's the Heart.	
Vladimir Kanjuh	1929		Macedonia		
Yariv Khaykin			Canada		
John Kjekshus	1936		Norway	chaired the National Association for Public Health from 2005. Member of the Norwegian Academy of Science and Letters, and was awarded the King's Medal of Merit	
Bhagawan Koirala	1960		Nepal		
Om Murti Anil	1978		Nepal	Known for raising health awareness against heart diseases. Received many awards including Suprabal Janasewa Shree, Best paper award by NHRC	
Nicholas Kounis			Greece	Described Kounis syndrome.	
Aldona Lukoševičiūtė	1929	2016	Lithuanian	Inventor of clinical defibrillation and stimulation methods in Lithuania	
Rashid Massumi	1926	2015	Iranian-American		
Quintiliano de Mesquita	1918	2000	Brazil		
Michel Mirowski	1924	1990	Polish-American	Implantable defibrillator	
Ivan Mitev	1924	2007	Bulgaria	Discovered the sixth heart tone	
Henry N. Neufeld	1923	1986	Israeli		
Denis Noble	1936		British	Awarded the State Prize of the USSR in the field of science and technology.	
Emmy Okello			Uganda		
Wendy S. Post			United States	Director of Research for the Hopkins Cardiovascular Fellowship Training Program	
Amiran Revishvili	1956		Russia		
Park Seung-jung			Korean		
Walter Somerville	1913	2005	Ireland		
Ramón M. Suárez	1895	1981	Puerto Rico		
Frans Van de Werf			Belgium	Editor-in-Chief, European Heart Journal	
Hein Wellens	1935	2020	Netherlands	Cardiac electro-physiology	
Karel Frederik Wenckebach	1864	1940	Netherlands and Austria		
Mónica Xavier	1956		Uruguay	Cardiologist turned politician	
Naresh Trehan	1946		Indian	Received numerous awards, including the Padma Shri, Padma Bhushan, Lal Bahadur Shastri National Award and Dr. B. C. Roy Award.	
Bruce Lerman			United States	Chief of the Division of Cardiology and Director of the Cardiac Electrophysiology Laboratory at Weill Cornell Medicine and the New York Presbyterian Hospital.	
Filip Swirski	1974-		United States	Professor, researcher and scientists, known for novel findings in Linking atherosclerosis with blood monocytosis.	

== See also ==
- List of cardiac pharmaceutical agents
