= Michel Haïssaguerre =

French cardiologist and electrophysiologist (born 1955)

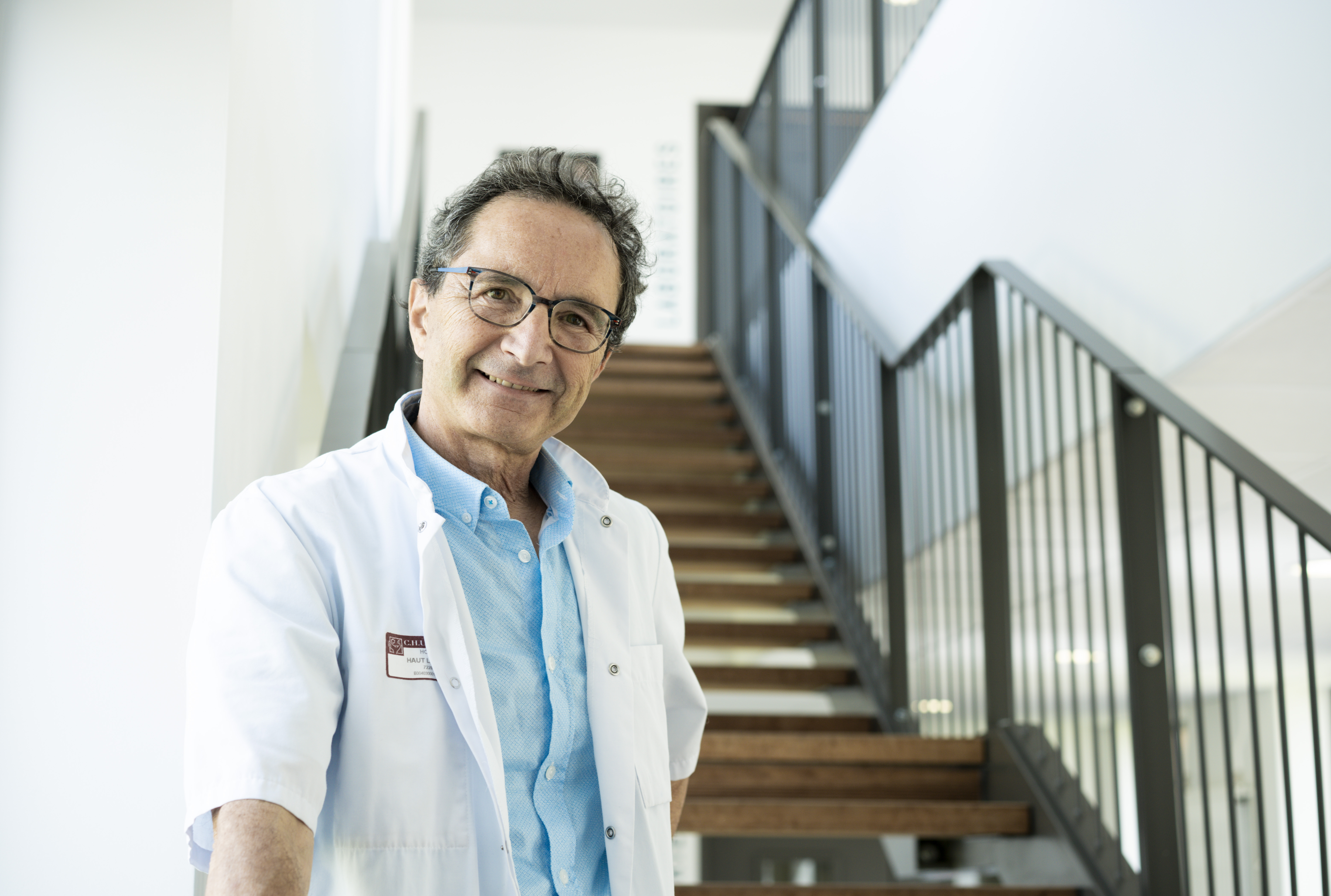
- Portrait of Haïssaguerre, 2020
- Born: 5 October 1955 (age 71)
- Citizenship: France
- Known for: Contributions in the area of cardiac fibrillation
- Scientific career
- Fields: Cardiac electrophysiology
- Workplaces: Hôpital Cardiologique du Haut–Lévèque / IHU Liryc

Michel Haïssaguerre (5 October 1955) is a French cardiologist and electrophysiologist. His investigations have been the basis for development of new markers and therapies for atrial and ventricular fibrillation.

== Biography ==
Haïssaguerre was born in Bayonne, France. He became a Professor of Cardiology in 1994. His present position is Chief of the Cardiac Pacing and Electrophysiology department at the Haut–Lévèque Cardiology Hospital, part of the Bordeaux University Hospital Community. He was elected a member of the French Academy of Sciences in 2010.

In 2011, he founded LIRYC, a research Institute focusing on Cardiac Electrophysiology and Modeling, which brings together 150 members from multiple disciplines. Its goal is to improve understanding of the electrical activity of the heart, to reduce suffering and mortality due to heart rhythm disorders.

His investigations have been the basis for development of new markers and therapies for atrial and ventricular fibrillation.

== Areas of research ==
Michel Haïssaguerre's research focuses on abnormalities of heart rhythm with particular interest in mapping and treatment for cardiac fibrillation.

In the early eighties, he investigated patients with cardiac arrhythmias caused by single pathological conditions, such as accessory pathway-related tachycardia (Wolff–Parkinson–White syndrome or Mahaim fibers), and junctional tachycardia. He showed that it was feasible to pinpoint the pathologies anywhere in the heart by direct recording electrical activity using intracardiac catheters. By delivering energy through the catheters and destroying tissue, the pathology could be eliminated, thereby curing the patient.

Later, Michel Haïssaguerre's team investigated cardiac fibrillation, the most complex and severe type of arrhythmias, defined as "turbulent, disorganized electrical activity". Cardiac fibrillation involves different mechanisms acting separately or together, the main phenomenon being circus movement, or reentry (Georges Ralph Mines, 1913). A combination of spatiotemporal factors is required to establish reentry, a process occurring at a macroscopic scale rather than at the cellular level, with antiarrhythmic drugs (ion channel blockers) having limited efficacy or even proarrythmic effects in clinic (CAST trial). Apart from antiarrhythmic drugs, a surgical approach to block electrical reentries had been proposed, by James Cox et al (1987) to treat atrial fibrillation, using a series of full-thickness incisions (Cox maze procedure)).

Michel Haïssaguerre developed multi-electrode catheters to perform wide area mapping and identify the primary activity at the origin of the fibrillation. Long mapping studies were needed due to the random nature of initiation. These studies demonstrated that specific sources were the genesis of 'chaotic' arrhythmias, creating a paradigm shift with regard to therapeutic strategies.

=== Atrial fibrillation ===
Atrial fibrillation is the most common heart rhythm disorder, affecting 2 to 3% of the population of Europe and North America. It is the cause of 20–25% of ischemic brain strokes. Michel Haïssaguerre was the first to identify that in most cases, atrial fibrillation is triggered by abnormal electrical impulses originating from the pulmonary veins, structures hitherto considered to be devoid of electrical activity. He pioneered the use of catheter ablation to treat atrial fibrillation using the technique of pulmonary vein isolation to prevent this abnormal electrical activity from reaching the atria. This technique underlies methods now used for treatment worldwide.

=== Ventricular fibrillation ===
Ventricular fibrillation is a major cause of cardiac arrest, or sudden cardiac death, which accounts for about 10% of mortality in adults, causing 350 000 deaths in the US each year. Michel Haïssaguerre's team showed that patients with sudden cardiac death and structurally normal hearts frequently had triggers originating from Purkinje fibers, a physiological tissue representing 2% of myocardial mass. The same tissue was confirmed to also play a pathogenic role in ventricular fibrillation associated with myocardial infarction, cardiomyopathies and other conditions. The team pioneered the use of catheter ablation to treat ventricular fibrillation in 2002.

Despite the effective treatments (implantable defibrillators, ablation) available for lethal ventricular arrhythmias, the major hurdle remains identification of subjects at risk of sudden death. Michel Haïssaguerre's team showed the role of subtle phenotypic markers present on the ECG, and demonstrated in collaboration with groups from Bangkok and Tsukuba, that different mechanisms could also lead to a similar phenotype. Further studies have focused on the enigmatic origin of 'sudden unexplained cardiac deaths': those for which no cause is found after a complete autopsy or detailed investigations (surviving patients). This pathology particularly affects young people at rest or during sleep. After identification of reentrant sources, they showed the presence of localized myocardial alteration at the sources, which may be the final damage caused by a number of diseases. This marker may open up new avenues for the early identification of subjects at risk, by electrical or imaging methods, combined with genetic analysis.

== Awards ==
Professor Michel Haïssaguerre has received a number of honors and awards:

- 1982 – Robert-Debré Award
- 1990 – Cardiology Information Award
- 1992 – Ela Medical Award
- 2002 – Nylin Medal (Swedish Society of Cardiology)
- 2003 – Best Scientist Award Grüntzig (European Society of Cardiology)
- 2004 – Pioneer in Cardiac Electrophysiology (North American Society of Pacing and Electrophysiology, currently the Heart Rhythm Society)
- 2009 – Mirowski Award for Excellence in Clinical Cardiology and Electrophysiology
- 2010 – Scientific Grand Prize of the Lefoulon-Delalande Foundation (Academy of Sciences)
- 2010 – Louis-Jeantet Prize for Medicine (Geneva)
- 2014 – KU Pioneer in Cardiovascular Electrophysiology
- 2015 – Gold medal European Society of Cardiology
- 2019 – Luigi Luciani Electrophysiology Award

== Scientific Papers ==
Michel Haïssaguerre and his team have published more than 800 publications in peer-reviewed cardiology journals dealing mainly with mapping and therapy of cardiac electrical disorders.
