= Wellens =

Wellens is a surname. It may refer to:

- Bart Wellens (born 1978), Belgian cyclo-cross and road cyclist
- Corneille Wellens (1905-????), Belgian field hockey player
- Hein Wellens (1935–2020), Dutch cardiologist
- Jacob Thomas Jozef Wellens (1726-1784), Roman Catholic bishop of Antwerp, Belgium
- Jessie Wellens, YouTuber part of PrankvsPrank
- Johan Wellens (born 1956), Belgian cyclist
- Leo Wellens (born 1959), Belgian cyclist
- Paul Wellens (born 1980), English rugby league footballer
- Paul Wellens (cyclist) (born 1952), Belgian road cyclist
- Richie Wellens (born 1980), English footballer
- Tim Wellens (born 1991), Belgian road cyclist
- Willy Wellens (born 1954), Belgian footballer

== See also ==
- Wellens' syndrome, electrocardiographic manifestation of critical proximal left anterior descending (LAD) coronary artery stenosis in people with unstable angina
- Wellen (disambiguation)
