= LIRYC =

LIRYC - Heart Rhythm Disease Institute
- Formation: 2011
- Purpose: Research : Cardiology, Electrophysiology, Imaging, modeling
- Location: Pessac, France
- Coordinates: 44.797383°N 0.660471°W
- Official language: French, English
- Parent organization: University of Bordeaux
- Affiliations: University of Bordeaux, University Hospital of Bordeaux, CNRS, INSERM, INRIA, Région Aquitaine
- Website: www.ihu-liryc.fr

Location of LIRYC in France

The Electrophysiology and Heart Modeling Institute (French: L'Institut de RYthmologie et Modélisation Cardiaque), is one of six French university hospital institutions created in 2011 as part of the Investments for the Future program (Investissements d'avenir) to boost medical research and innovation.

This institute, headed by Professor Pierre Jaïs along with Professor Michel Haissaguerre, Dr Mélèze Hocini and the cardiology teams of the University Hospital of Bordeaux, unites multiple specialties around cardiac electrophysiology from research on ionic channels (microgenerators producing electric flows in cells) to whole heart and patient care.

== Institute presentation ==
LIRYC is a basic research, clinical and teaching centre focusing on the understanding, care and treatment of cardiac electrical diseases that lead to heart failure and sudden death.

It includes national and international doctors and researchers in cardiology, imaging and signal processing and modeling, who have overlapping interests and skills in cardiac bio-electricity.

== Research fields ==
Cardiovascular disease is the primary cause of mortality in the world, accounting for 30% of deaths, followed by communicable, maternal, neonatal and nutrition conditions (23%) and cancer (13%).

Cardiac electrical diseases are responsible for more than 700,000 deaths each year in Europe.

Atrial fibrillation ECG

- Half of these deaths come from heart failure which often develops from electrical heart rhythm problems such as atrial fibrillation.

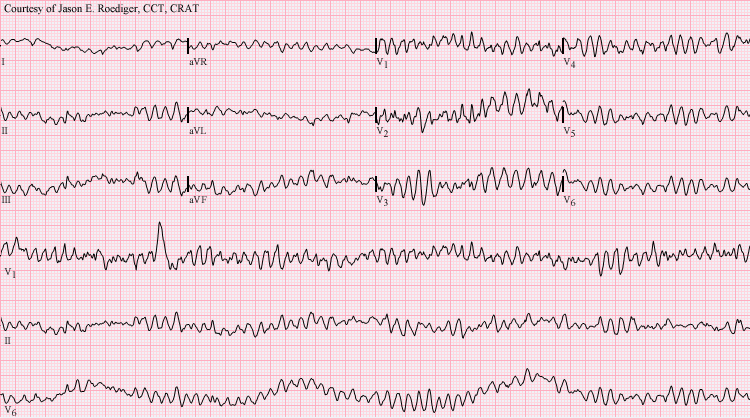
Ventricular fibrillation ECG

- The other half of these deaths occur suddenly due to an extreme and instantly fatal cardiac turbulence called ventricular fibrillation, which can be compared to an electric "tornado". (The term "cardiac arrest" is often confused with "sudden death" from ventricular fibrillation.) This sudden death rate is equal to the combined deaths from breast, lung, and colon cancer and AIDS.

LIRYC focuses on cardiac electrical diseases responsible for mortality or severe disability (embolic stroke). It utilizes a multidisciplinary approach which combines several fields such as high resolution mapping, cardiac imaging, and signal processing and cardiac modeling.

== Partnerships ==
Partners include academic teams from research institutions such as INSERM, CNRS, INRIA, the University of Bordeaux, and the University Hospital of Bordeaux, as well as health care industry partners.

== Facilities ==
Research teams currently work at the Technological Platform for Biomedical Innovation (French: Plateforme technologique d'innovation biomédicale - PTIB)", which is located at the Xavier Arnozan Hospital in Pessac.

By 2015, a 6,000 square meter extension of the existing PTIB building will be built. It will house a platform for medical research and innovation, combining facilities and competencies in electrophysiology (optical mapping), interventional cardiology, cardiac imaging (high resolution MRI 9.4 Tesla), modeling and signal processing. It will also provide a training centre for students, engineers and researchers in collaboration with the main health care companies.

== See also ==
- University of Bordeaux
- INSERM - National Institute of Health and Medical Research
- CNRS - French National Centre for Scientific Research
- INRIA - National Institute for Research in Computer Science and Control
