= Khaykin =

Khaykin is a surname. Notable people with the surname include:

- Boris Khaykin (1904–1978), Russian conductor
- Elizabeth Khaykin, Georgian-American epidemiologist
- Nikita Khaykin (born 1995), Russian-Israeli footballer
- Yaariv Khaykin, Canadian cardiologist and clinical researcher
