= Revishvili =

Revishvili may refer to:

- Amiran Revishvili (born 1956), Georgian cardiac surgeon and electrophysiologist
- Irakli Revishvili (born 1989), Georgian swimmer
- Nukri Revishvili (born 1987), Georgian footballer
- Zaza Revishvili (born 1968), Georgian footballer
