= George Klein (physician) =

Canadian cardiologist

George J. Klein Professor
- Citizenship: Canada
- Education: University of Toronto
- Title: Professor of Medicine, Chair of Cardiology at London Health Sciences Centre
- Scientific career
- Fields: Cardiac electrophysiology
- Workplaces: University of Western Ontario
- Doctoral advisor: Dr. John Gallagher

George J. Klein is a Canadian cardiologist and cardiac electrophysiologist, currently serving as Professor of Medicine at Western University in London, Ontario, Canada.

== Biography ==
Klein graduated from the University of Toronto in 1972.

== Research ==
Klein's research focused on cardiac arrhythmia, particularly Wolff–Parkinson–White syndrome, the surgical and ablative management of heart rhythm disturbances and the understanding of syncope.

== See also ==
- Mark Josephson
- Hein Wellens
