= George Klein =

George Klein may refer to:

- George Klein (inventor) (1904–1992), Canadian inventor
- George Klein (comics) (c. 1915 or 1920 – 1969), American comic book artist
- George Klein (biologist) (1925–2016), Hungarian-Swedish biologist and writer
- George Klein (physician), Canadian cardiologist
- George Klein (DJ) (1935–2019), disc jockey and television host
- George Klein (Canadian football) (1932–?), Canadian football player
- George S. Klein (1917–1971), American psychologist and psychoanalyst
- Adam Klein (swimmer) (George Klein IV, born 1988), American swimmer

== See also ==
- Georg Klein (disambiguation)
- George Klyne (1828–1875), Member of the Legislative Assembly of Manitoba
- George Kline (1921–2014), American philosopher, Russian scholar and academic
