= S. I. Padmavati =

Indian medical academic (1917–2020)

Padmavati Sivaramakrishna
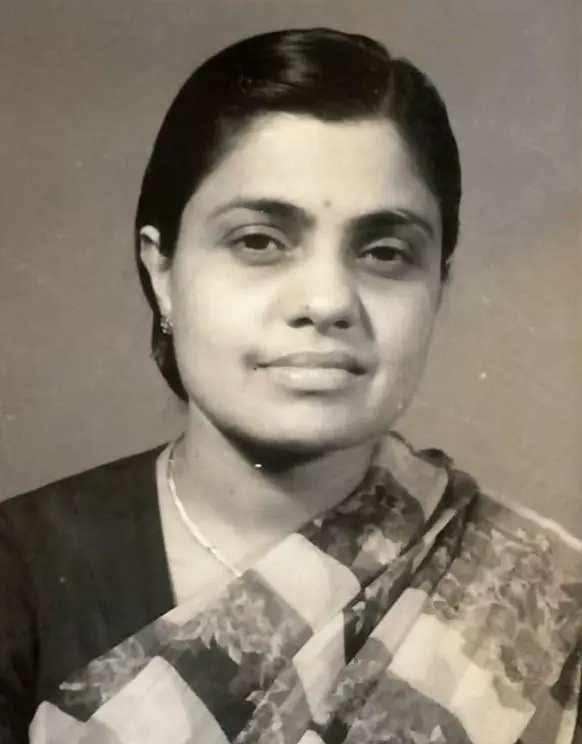
- Born: 20 June 1917; British Burma
- Died: 29 August 2020 (aged 103); New Delhi, India
- Education: F.R.C.P. (London), F.R.C.P.E., F.A.C.C., F.A.M.S., D.Sc. (Hon.)
- Alma mater: University of Medicine 1, Yangon; Johns Hopkins University; Harvard Medical School
- Occupations: cardiologist, Director National Heart Institute, Delhi; Founder-president, All India Heart Foundation
- Years active: 1953–2020
- Scientific career
- Academic advisors: Paul Dudley White; Helen B. Taussig

Sivaramakrishna Iyer Padmavati (20 June 1917 – 29 August 2020) was an Indian cardiologist. She was director of the National Heart Institute, Delhi, and the founder president of the All India Heart Foundation. The institute collaborates with the World Health Organization (WHO) in training students in preventive cardiology. Padmavati was awarded India's second highest civilian honour, the Padma Vibhushan in 1992. Padmavati, an elected fellow of the National Academy of Medical Sciences, was the first woman cardiologist in India and established the first cardiac clinic and cardiac catheter lab in India.

== Early life and education ==
Padmavati was born to a barrister in Burma (now Myanmar) on 20 June 1917. She had three brothers and two sisters.

Hers was the story of an indomitable spirit, cultivated during the gory days of the Second World War. Japan's invasion of Myanmar in 1942 forced Padmavati, her mother and sisters to flee Myanmar for Coimbatore, in the Indian state of Tamil Nadu, leaving their male relatives behind. The family was only reunited once the war ended in 1945.

She received an MBBS degree from Rangoon Medical College and later moved to London in 1949, where she received a FRCP from Royal College of Physicians, followed by FRCPE from Royal College of Physicians of Edinburgh. In her time in the United Kingdom, she worked at the National Heart Hospital, National Chest Hospital, and the National Hospital, Queen Square, London.

Subsequently, after finishing her FRCP, she moved to Sweden for three months, where she took cardiology courses at the Southern Hospital. Meanwhile, she applied for fellowship at the Johns Hopkins Hospital, Baltimore, part of Johns Hopkins University, and was selected, and went on to study with noted cardiologist Helen Taussig. In 1952, she joined Harvard Medical School (Harvard University), where she studied under Paul Dudley White, a pioneer in modern cardiology.

== Career ==
Back in India, she started her career in 1953, as a lecturer at Lady Hardinge Medical College, Delhi, where she opened a cardiology clinic. In 1954, she was among the first few women cardiologists in India, later as an examiner with Medical Council of India she started the first DM in cardiology in India. She founded the All India Heart Foundation (AIHF) in 1962, with group of physicians and industrialist Ashok Jain of Bennett, Coleman & Co. Ltd.

She joined Maulana Azad Medical College, Delhi in 1967, and was awarded the Padma Bhushan, by Government of India in the same year. She established one of the first departments of cardiology, at the G. B. Pant Hospital, which is within the college campus. She was the Secretary General of the 5th World Congress of Cardiology, New Delhi in 1966.

During the 1970s, she was the chief administrator of 3 major institutions at the same time - Maulana Azad Medical College, Lok Nayak Hospital and G.B.Pant hospital. She retired as the Director (Principal) of the Maulana Azad Medical college, in 1978.

Post retirement, she set up the National Heart Institute (NHI) under AIHF, in South Delhi, in 1981, which expanded in following years to include tertiary patient care, research and population outreach, and where she continued to work. She was also an Emeritus Professor of Medicine and Cardiology of the University of Delhi.

Padmavati became a fellow of the European Society of Cardiology, in 2007, at the age of 90, making her the most senior fellow of the ESC.

== Awards and honors ==
State honors:

- Padma Bhushan, India's third highest civilian honor (1967)
- Padma Vibhushan, India's second highest civilian honor (1992)

== Death ==
On 29 August 2020, Padmavati died from complications due to COVID-19 during the COVID-19 pandemic in India at the National Heart Institute in New Delhi. She was aged 103 at the time of her death, and was the oldest living doctor in India. Her body was cremated at a special COVID-19 crematorium at Punjabi Bagh in New Delhi.

== See also ==
- List of cardiologists
