= Robbert de Winter =

Dutch cardiologist

Robbert Jan de Winter (born on August 23, 1958) is a Dutch cardiologist who along with Niels Verouden, Arthur Wilde, and Hein J.J. Wellens described the namesake De Winter syndrome, a rare presentation of myocardial infarction of the left anterior descending artery (LAD) without obvious ST segment elevation, found in 2% of LAD occlusions. De Winter is currently a professor of clinical cardiology at the Faculty of Medicine of the University of Amsterdam.
