= Cardiac electrophysiology =

Science of elucidating, diagnosing, and treating the electrical activities of the heart

Drawing of the ECG, with labels of intervals

Cardiac electrophysiology or Electrocardiophysiology is a branch of cardiology and basic science focusing on the electrical activities of the heart. The term is usually used in clinical context, to describe studies of such phenomena by invasive (intracardiac) catheter recording of spontaneous activity as well as of cardiac responses to programmed electrical stimulation - clinical cardiac electrophysiology. However, cardiac electrophysiology also encompasses basic research and translational research components. Specialists studying cardiac electrophysiology, either clinically or solely through research, are known as cardiac electrophysiologists.

== Description ==
Electrophysiological (EP) studies are performed to assess complex arrhythmias, elucidate symptoms, evaluate abnormal electrocardiograms, assess risk of developing arrhythmias in the future, and design treatment. These procedures include therapeutic methods (typically radiofrequency ablation, or cryoablation) in addition to diagnostic and prognostic procedures. Other therapeutic modalities used in this field include antiarrhythmic drug therapy and implantation of pacemakers, implantable cardioverter-defibrillators and cardiac resynchronisation therapy devices.

== Electrophysiological study ==
The cardiac electrophysiology (EP) study typically measures the response of myocardium to programmed electrical stimulation (PES) on specific pharmacological regimens in order to assess the likelihood that the regimen will successfully prevent potentially fatal sustained ventricular tachycardia (VT) or ventricular fibrillation VF (VF) in the future. Sometimes a series of EP study drug trials must be conducted to enable the cardiologist to select the one regimen for long-term treatment that best prevents or slows the development of VT or VF following PES. Such studies may also be conducted in the presence of a newly implanted or newly replaced cardiac pacemaker or ICD.

== Physician specialists ==
A specialist in cardiac electrophysiology is known as an electrophysiologist, or "heart electrician" in layman' terms. Cardiac electrophysiology is a subspecialty of cardiology in most countries and usually requires two or more years of EP fellowship training after a general cardiology residency. In early 2011, the Centers for Medicare and Medicaid Services promoted cardiac electrophysiology to its own specialty category in the United States. Cardiac electrophysiologists are trained to perform interventional cardiac electrophysiology studies and cardiac rhythm management device implantations.

=== Research cardiac electrophysiologist ===
Cardiac electrophysiologists specialize in a sub-area of electrophysiology, which in turn is a sub-area of physiology. This specialization usually requires education at the doctoral (PhD, DSc, or MD/DO) level to become a principal investigator for research projects. The area of research is often multi-disciplinary involving chemistry, bioelectrics, biology, and biomedical engineering. The flagship tools used by cardiac electrophysiologists overlap with the toolbox of the neuroscientist including patch clamp and optical mapping.

== Allied professionals ==
Mapping specialists (EP techs, EP physiologists) are typically educated up to the Bachelor's or Master's level and are employed by either a cardiac electrophysiology company or department. Often international certification such as Certified Electrophysiology Specialist (CEPS) by the International Board of Heart Rhythm Examiners (IBHRE) or EHRA Certified Electrophysiology Specialist (ECES) or equivalent is required.

== Subdiscipline ==
Cardiac electrophysiology is a relatively young subdiscipline of cardiology and internal medicine. It was developed during the mid-1970s by Hein J. J. Wellens, professor of medicine at the University of Maastricht in the Netherlands and attending cardiologist at the Academic Hospital in Maastricht. In 1980 the first microprocessor based stimulator was developed there.

== Textbook ==
The author of the definitive textbook in the field is by the late Mark E. Josephson, former Robinette Professor of Medicine and chief of cardiology at the University of Pennsylvania School of Medicine in Philadelphia, Pennsylvania, professor of medicine at Harvard Medical School, and attending cardiologist at Beth Israel Deaconess Medical Center in Boston, Massachusetts. The most recent published edition of Clinical Cardiac Electrophysiology: Techniques and Interpretations is the 6th edition in 2020.

== Professional societies ==
The Heart Rhythm Society, founded in 1979, promotes education and advocacy for cardiac arrhythmia professionals (including cardiac electrophysiologists) and patients. European Heart Rhythm Association, a part of European Society of Cardiology, is active in Europe.

== Certification ==
Founded in 1985 as NASPExAM, the International Board of Heart Rhythm Examiners (IBHRE) offers knowledge based board exams for physicians and allied health professionals working in the field of cardiac electrophysiology and cardiac rhythm device management. European Heart Rhythm Association (EHRA) provides knowledge and practical competency based certification to physicians and allied health professionals as well as accreditation of cardiac electrophysiology training centres in Europe and neighbouring countries.

== Mapping systems ==
Electroanatomic mapping uses electric and magnetic fields to create three dimensional models of heart structures using specialized catheters.

== Notable cardiac electrophysiologists ==
- Kenneth Ellenbogen, American
- Richard N. Fogoros, American
- Michel Haïssaguerre (born 1955), French
- Mark Josephson (1943–2017), American
- George Klein, Canadian
- Bruce Lerman, American
- John Alexander MacWilliam (1857–1937), British/Scottish
- Michel Mirowski (1924–1990), Polish-Israeli-American
- Eric Prystowsky, American
- Amiran Revishvili (born 1956), Russian
- Hein Wellens (1935–2020), Dutch

== See also ==
- Clinical cardiac electrophysiology
- Electrical conduction system of the heart
- Electrocardiogram
- Electrophysiology study
- Radiofrequency ablation
