= Georg Klein =

Georg Klein may refer to:

- Georg Klein (composer) (born 1964), German composer
- George Klein (biologist) (1925–2016), Hungarian-Swedish biologist and writer who uses the name Georg in Swedish texts
- Georg Klein (writer) (born 1953), German author
- Georg Klein (volleyball) (born 1991), German volleyball player

== See also ==
- George Klein (disambiguation)
