= George Ralph Mines =

British electrophysiologist

- Born: May 13, 1886; Bath, Great Britain
- Died: November 7, 1914; Montreal, Quebec, Canada
- Scientific career
- Fields: Cardiac electrophysiology
- Workplaces: McGill University

George Ralph Mines was a pioneering English cardiac electrophysiologist. He was educated at the University of Cambridge. After gaining his degree he taught at Newnham College. There he met Dorothy Dale with whom he collaborated and the two went on to publish several papers in the Journal of Physiology. Mines went on to make two important contributions to cardiac electrophysiology. Initially, he proposed that an action potential wave front could propagate in a circle, repeatedly activating the tissue. Second, he discovered the vulnerable period of the heart: the time during the cardiac cycle when a single stimulus can induce ventricular fibrillation.

On November 7, 1914, Mines was found unconscious in his laboratory, and died later that day. His death may have been caused by self-experimentation using electrical stimuli.

A special issue of the Journal of Physiology was published in September 2013 in honor of the 100th anniversary of Mines' most notable work and his death. The archives of physiologist Frank Campbell MacIntosh (1909-1992), held at the Osler Library of the History of Medicine, McGill University, contain a dossier on Mines assembled by Dr. MacIntosh from 1982-1986 including publications, photographs, obituaries, and autopsy information on Mines, as well as correspondence regarding his death and a copy of "The short brilliant career and strange death of G.R. Mines," written by MacIntosh in 1985.
