= Wellen (disambiguation) =

Wellen is a municipality in Belgium.

Wellen may also refer to:

== Places ==
- Wellen, Rhineland-Palatinate, a municipality in Rhineland-Palatinate, Germany
- Wellen, Saxony-Anhalt, a municipality in Saxony-Anhalt, Germany

== People with the surname ==
- Niklas Wellen (born 1994), German field hockey player
- Remy Wellen (born 1938), German ice hockey forward

== Others ==
- Wellen (novel), a 1911 novel by Eduard von Keyserling

== See also ==
- Wellens
