= De Winter syndrome =

de Winter syndrome
- Other names: de Winter pattern, de Winter T waves, de Winter's T-waves
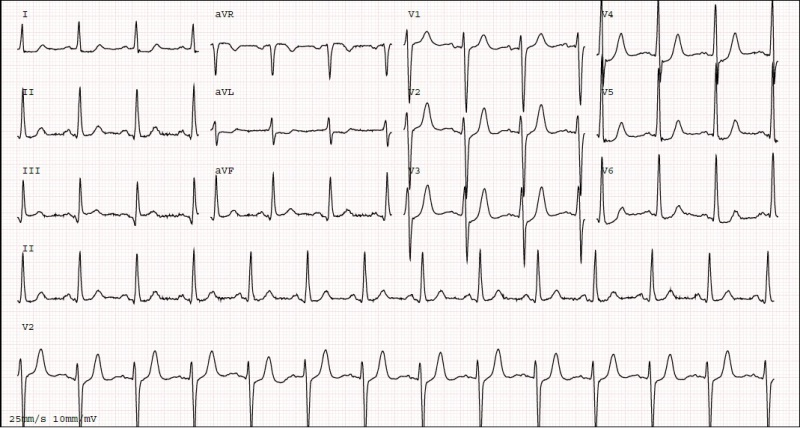
- ECG showing De Winter syndrome with upsloping ST-segment depression and tall symmetrical T-waves in lead V1 to V6
- Specialty: Cardiology
- Symptoms: Chest pain, shortness of breath
- Usual onset: Sudden
- Causes: Blockage of the left anterior descending artery (LAD)
- Diagnostic method: ECG
- Differential diagnosis: High potassium, tachycardia, benign early repolarization
- Treatment: As per ST elevation MI (STEMI)
- Frequency: 2.5% of anterior MIs
- Deaths: High

de Winter syndrome is an electrocardiogram (ECG) pattern which often represents sudden near blockage of the left anterior descending artery (LAD). Symptoms include chest pain, shortness of breath, and sweating.

While typically due to blockage of the LAD, other arteries of the heart may be involved. Risk factors are similar to other types of ischemic heart disease. The underlying mechanism is unclear; though may involve subendocardial ischemia or collateral circulation.

Diagnosis is based on an ECG showing ST-segment depression at the J-point of 1 to 3 mm in leads V1 to V6, with tall and symmetrical T waves. The ST-segment is upsloping and there is also often ST-segment elevation of 0.5 to 2 mm in lead aVR. The QRS complex is either normal or slightly wide.

Treatment is as per an ST elevation MI (STEMI), with primary percutaneous coronary intervention (PCI) being preferred. De Winter syndrome is uncommon, representing about 2 to 3% of people with anterior MIs. Males are more commonly affected than females. It was first described in 2008 by Robbert J. de Winter.
