= Heart Rhythm =

- Discipline: Cardiology
- Language: English
- Edited by: Sami Viskin

Publication details
- History: 2004-present
- Publisher: Elsevier
- Frequency: Monthly
- Impact factor: 5.8 (2024)

Standard abbreviations
- ISO 4: Heart Rhythm

Indexing
- ISSN: 1547-5271 (print); 1556-3871 (web)
- LCCN: 2003212594
- OCLC no.: 53439711

Links
- Journal homepage; Online access; Online archive

Heart Rhythm is a peer-reviewed medical journal published by Elsevier that covers the study and management of cardiac arrhythmia. It is the official journal of the Heart Rhythm Society, the Cardiac Electrophysiology Society, and the Pediatric & Congenital Electrophysiology Society. Its major focus is research and therapy of heart rhythm disorders, including mechanisms and electrophysiology, clinical and experimental, genetics, ablation, devices, drugs, and surgery. Other sections include contemporary reviews, unique case reports, viewpoints, Hands On, images, creative concepts, and editorial commentaries. New sections in 2024 include Iconic Figures and Top Stories.

== History ==
The first issue of Heart Rhythm was published in May 2004 with Douglas Zipes, MD, FHRS, as the founding editor in chief. The Editor-in-Chief from 2014-2023 was Peng-Sheng Chen, MD, FHRS. The Editor-in-Chief since January 2024 is Sami Viskin, MD.

The companion journals to Heart Rhythm are HeartRhythm Case Reports, which was founded in 2015 and Heart Rhythm O^{2}, which launched in April 2020.

== Abstracting and indexing ==
The journal is abstracted and indexed in Academic OneFile, CINAHL, Current Contents, EMBASE, Excerpta Medica, InfoTrac Custom, MEDLINE, Science Citation Index, and Scopus.
