= HeartRhythm Case Reports =

Open access medical journal

- Discipline: Cardiology
- Language: English
- Edited by: T. Jared Bunch

Publication details
- History: 2015-present
- Publisher: Elsevier
- Frequency: Monthly
- Open access: Yes

Standard abbreviations
- ISO 4: HeartRhythm Case Rep.

Indexing
- ISSN: 2214-0271
- LCCN: 2016243299
- OCLC no.: 932851878

Links
- Journal homepage; Online access; Online archive

HeartRhythm Case Reports (HRCR) is an online-only, open access medical journal that publishes case reports, images, and educational articles in the field of cardiac arrhythmias and electrophysiology. HRCR is the second peer-reviewed journal from the Heart Rhythm Society and is published by Elsevier.

== Journal Scope ==
HRCR focuses on all aspects of cardiac rhythm management with an emphasis on education. Articles describe the diagnosis and treatment of heart rhythm disorders and the electrophysiology of the heart and blood vessels. Sections of the journal include: Case Reports, Clinical Problem Solving, Images, Electrocardiogram Unknowns, Letters to the Editor, and an Allied Health Professional Section.

== History ==
The first issue of HRCR was published in January 2015 with T. Jared Bunch, MD, FHRS, as the founding editor in chief. Initially, the journal published an issue every other month but in 2017 switched to monthly publication.

== Abstracting and indexing ==
The journal is abstracted and indexed in Scopus and PubMed Central.
