= HMR 1883 =

Chemical compound

HMR 1883 (1-[5-[2-(5-chloro-o-anisamido)ethyl]-2-methoxyphenyl]sulfonyl-3 methylthiourea) and its sodium salt HMR 1098, are experimental anti-arrhythmic drugs classified as sulfonylurea compounds. Their main purpose is to treat ventricular fibrillation caused by myocardial ischemia. They were synthesized via structural modifications to glibenclamide, an antidiabetic drug. Both HMR 1883 and glibenclamide act by inactivating the ATP-sensitive potassium channels (KATP) responsible for potassium efflux. Unlike glibenclamide, HMR 1883 has been suggested to target selectively the Kir6.2/SUR2A KATP subtype, found mostly in the membranes of cardiac cells. However, data showing that HMR 1098 inhibits the Kir6.2/SUR1 KATP subtype found in insulin-secreting pancreatic beta cells challenges this view.

== Mechanism ==
Hypoxia provokes potassium efflux from cardiac muscles cells via the activation of ATP-sensitive potassium channels (KATP). Potassium efflux from cardiac cells decreases action potential duration and results in non-uniform repolarization of the cardiac cells. The heterogeneous repolarization of the cardiac tissue permits reentry of action potentials into conducting pathways, which manifests as malignant arrhythmias in the heart. HMR 1883 is a cardioselective ATP-sensitive potassium channel antagonist that prevents the potassium efflux, hence correcting the non-uniform refractory period in the ischemic tissue. A uniform refractory period corrects the conductance problems in the heart and prevents the re-entry arrhythmias.

== Side effects ==
HMR 1883 attenuates is chemically induced arrhythmias with little to no side effects as a result of having a higher affinity for the cardiac tissue KATP subtype than any other subtype found in the body. In contrast, glibenclamide interacts with many KATP channels throughout the body resulting in many side effects. In particular its interaction with coronary smooth muscle cells and pancreatic-β cells cause decreased coronary blood flow, hyperinsulinemia, and hypoglycemia. Since KATP channels only become activated during periods of low ATP and High ADP, HMR 1883 only affects hypoxic tissue and has no negative effect on the normal tissue. Activation of the KATP channels on cardiac mitochondria is involved in ischemic preconditioning that results in protection for the heart. It was shown that HMR 1883 did not interfere with the mitochondrial protective mechanisms in both rat and rabbit models. By not inhibiting the mitochondrial KATP channel subtype, HMR 1883 can treat cardiac arrhythmias while permitting mitochondrial protective mechanisms.

== Research ==
HMR 1883 has been shown to attenuate and decrease ventricular fibrillation in anesthetized pigs, rats and conscious dogs. Its sodium salt, HMR 1098, has been shown to decrease ventricular fibrillation in rabbit hearts, anesthetized rats and dogs.
