= Bruce Lerman =

Cardiologist

- Education: Clark University (BA); Loyola University Chicago (MD)
- Scientific career
- Fields: Cardiology
- Workplaces: Weill Cornell Medical College; New York Presbyterian Hospital

Bruce B. Lerman is a cardiologist. He is the Hilda Altschul Master Professor of Medicine at Weill Cornell Medical College, and was chief of the Division of Cardiology and director of the Cardiac Electrophysiology Laboratory at Weill Cornell Medicine and the New York Presbyterian Hospital.

== Education ==
Lerman received a BA at Clark University in 1972, an MD medical degree from Loyola University - Stritch School of Medicine in 1977, was an intern and medical resident in internal medicine at Northwestern University, and completed a fellowship in cardiovascular disease at the Johns Hopkins School of Medicine. He trained in cardiac electrophysiology at the Perelman School of Medicine at the University of Pennsylvania.

== Career ==
Lerman is a cardiologist in New York City, with specialties in adult congenital heart disease and cardiac electrophysiology.

Lerman is the Hilda Altschul Master Professor of Medicine at Weill Cornell Medical College, and chief of the Division of Cardiology and director of the Cardiac Electrophysiology Laboratory at Weill Cornell Medicine and the New York Presbyterian Hospital.

He has focused in his research on clarifying the electrophysiologic mechanisms of the nucleoside adenosine, current-based defibrillation, and determining the role of mechanoelectrical feedback as a stimulus for causing malignant ventricular arrhythmias. He has been issued 4 patents. Lerman has focused in his clinical work on the diagnosis and treatment by ablation of complicated atrial and ventricular arrhythmias, and treating life-threatening arrhythmias with implantable devices.

Lerman received the Established Investigator Award from the American Heart Association, and had received a number of grants from the National Institutes of Health. He is on the editorial boards of a number of medical and scientific journals, including Circulation and Heart Rhythm.

== Publications ==
Lerman has written or co-written over 200 medical articles, 60 book chapters, and two books.

Among his publications are:

- "Risk of Mortality Following Catheter Ablation of Atrial Fibrillation." Journal of the American College of Cardiology. 2019
- "Sex-based differences in outcomes, 30-day readmissions, and costs following catheter ablation of atrial fibrillation: the United States Nationwide Readmissions Database 2010-14." European Heart Journal. 2019
- "The anatomic substrates for outflow tract arrhythmias." Heart Rhythm. 2019
- "Left atrial thrombus and dense spontaneous echocardiographic contrast in patients on continuous direct oral anticoagulant therapy undergoing catheter ablation of atrial fibrillation: Comparison of dabigatran, rivaroxaban, and apixaban." Heart Rhythm. 2018
- "Fluoroless catheter ablation of atrial fibrillation." Heart Rhythm. 2017
- "Limitations of dormant conduction as a predictor of atrial fibrillation recurrence and pulmonary vein reconnection after catheter ablation." PACE - Pacing and Clinical Electrophysiology. 2015
- "Differentiation of Papillary Muscle from Fascicular and Mitral Annular Ventricular Arrhythmias in Patients with and Without Structural Heart Disease." Circulation: Arrhythmia and Electrophysiology. 2015
- "Mechanism, diagnosis, and treatment of outflow tract tachycardia." Nature Reviews Cardiology. 2015
- "Ubiquitous myocardial extensions into the pulmonary artery demonstrated by integrated intracardiac echocardiography and electroanatomic mapping: changing the paradigm of idiopathic right ventricular outflow tract arrhythmias." Circulation: Arrhythmia and Electrophysiology. 2014
- Dr. Craig T. Basson, MD, PhD, Dr. Bruce B. Lerman, MD (2009), Topics in Arrhythmias and Ischemic Heart Disease, Demos Medical Publishing.
