= Frans Van de Werf =

Cardiologist

Frans Van de Werf is a Belgian cardiologist at the University Hospital Leuven and professor emeritus, Department of Cardiovascular Sciences, Katholieke Universiteit Leuven. He was the chair of the university hospital's cardiovascular medicine department until 2011.

He was born in Mechelen in 1947. He earned his M.D. from Katholieke Universiteit Leuven in 1972. His research is focused on acute coronary syndromes, thrombolysis and antithrombotic treatment. His doctoral thesis was an early treatise on the mechanism underlying the gallop rhythm in heart failure. Later, he collaborated in Leuven with Désiré Collen to discover the clinical application of tissue plasminogen activator (tPA).

Van de Werf was editor-in-chief of the European Heart Journal until 2008 and has served on the editorial boards of Circulation, New England Journal of Medicine, International Journal of Cardiology, Coronary artery disease, Journal of Thrombosis and Thrombolysis.

He was awarded the 2005 Joseph Maisin prize for €100.000.

In 2013, the Frans Van de Werf Fund was inaugurated at the KU Leuven. The Fund aims to promote and support clinical cardiovascular research. This includes: financial support of clinical studies conducted at KU Leuven and awarding two scholarships up to 80 000 euro per year to promising KU Leuven researchers or researchers from outside KU Leuven.
