= John Kjekshus =

Norwegian professor of medicine (born 1936)

John Karsten Kjekshus (born 11 March 1936) is a Norwegian professor of medicine.

He grew up at Solli. He took the Cand.med. degree in 1969 and the Dr.med. degree in 1972, both at the University of Oslo. He also studied at the University of California, San Diego from 1969 to 1970. He was a chief physician at Bærum Hospital from 1984 to 1992, then a professor at the University of Oslo and Rikshospitalet from 1992 to 2006. He chaired the Norwegian Cardiological Society from 1992 to 1994 and has chaired the National Association for Public Health from 2005. He is a member of the Norwegian Academy of Science and Letters since 1995 and was awarded the King's Medal of Merit in 2007.

He is married and has three children, and resides at Haslum.
