= Wellens' syndrome =

Heart condition

- Other names: Wellens' sign, Wellens' warning, Wellens' waves
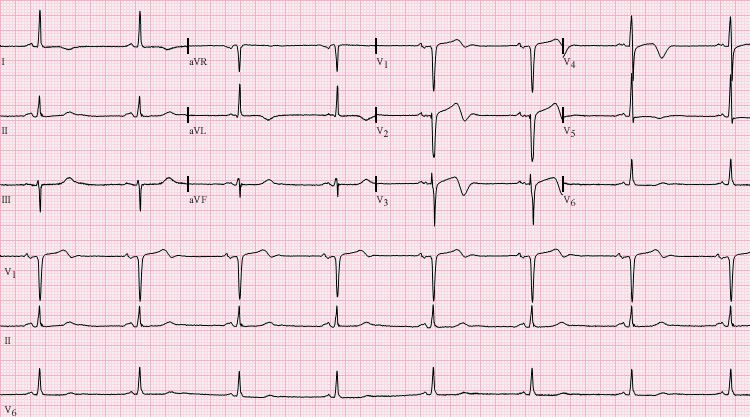
- EKG of a 69-year-old black male with Wellens' syndrome. Visible in leads V1-V4, here with a biphasic T-wave with negativisation.
- Specialty: Cardiology

Wellens' syndrome is an electrocardiographic manifestation of critical proximal left anterior descending (LAD) coronary artery stenosis in people with unstable angina. Originally thought of as two separate types, A and B, it is now considered an evolving wave form, initially of biphasic T wave inversions and later becoming symmetrical, often deep (>2 mm), T wave inversions in the anterior precordial leads.

First described by Hein J. J. Wellens and colleagues in 1982 in a subgroup of people with unstable angina, it does not seem to be rare, appearing in 18% of patients in his original study. A subsequent prospective study identified this syndrome in 14% of patients at presentation and 60% of patients within the first 24 hours.

The presence of Wellens' syndrome carries significant diagnostic and prognostic value. All people in the De Zwann's study with characteristic findings had more than 50% stenosis of the left anterior descending artery (mean = 85% stenosis) with complete or near-complete occlusion in 59%. In the original Wellens' study group, 75% of those with the typical syndrome manifestations had an anterior myocardial infarction. Sensitivity and specificity for significant (more or equal to 70%) stenosis of the LAD artery was found to be 69% and 89%, respectively, with a positive predictive value of 86%.

Wellens' sign has also been seen as a rare presentation of Takotsubo cardiomyopathy or stress cardiomyopathy.

== Diagnosis ==
The diagnosis is done via:

- Progressive symmetrical deep T wave inversion in leads V2 and V3
- Slope of inverted T waves generally at 60°-90°
- Little or no cardiac marker elevation
- Discrete or no ST segment elevation
- No loss of precordial R waves.
Coronary angiogram, with video on the left showing tight, critical (95%) stenosis of the proximal LAD in a patient who had Wellens' warning; video on the right shows the same patient after reperfusion.

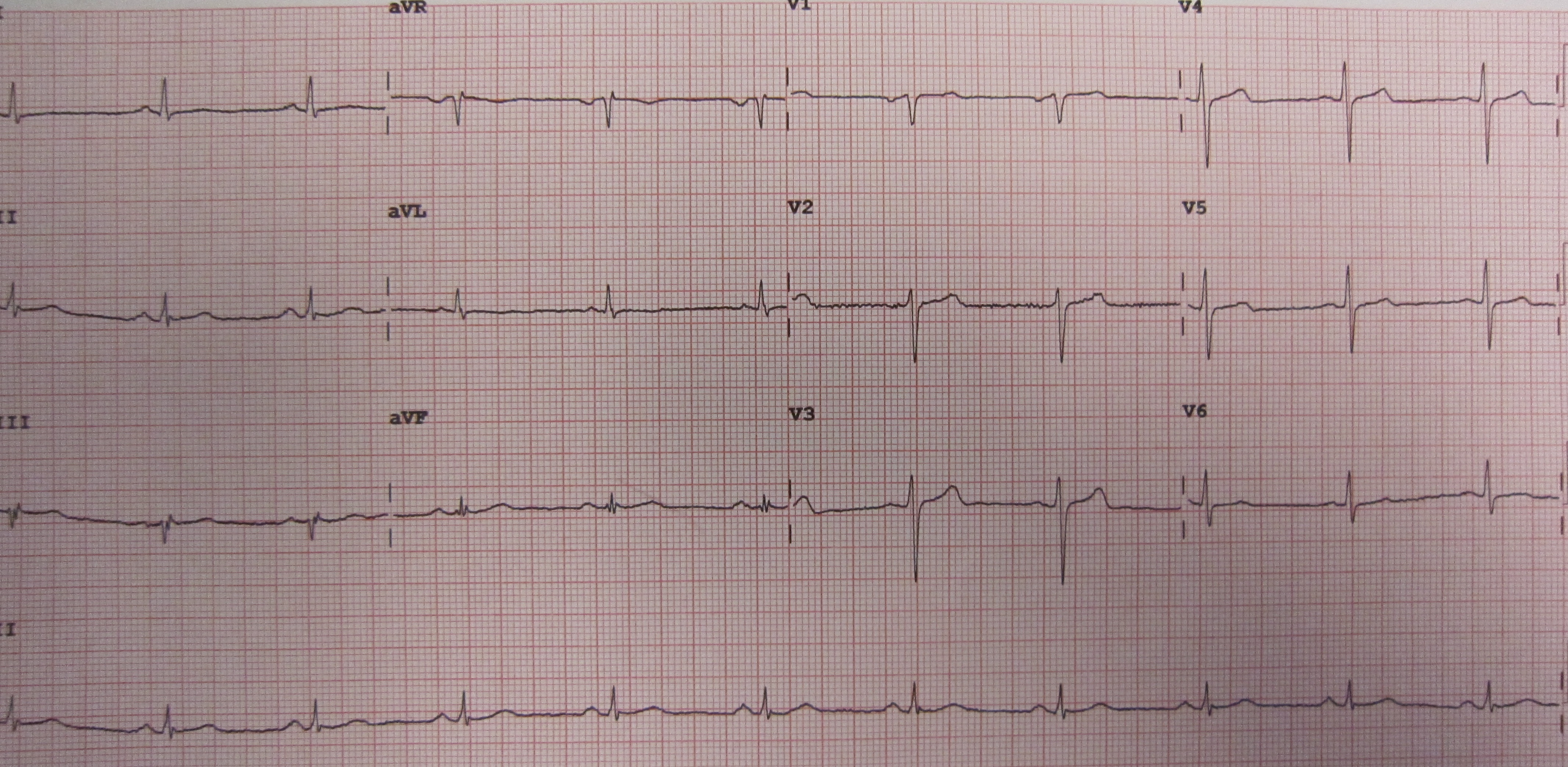
EKG/ECG in someone with Wellens' syndrome when having chest pain

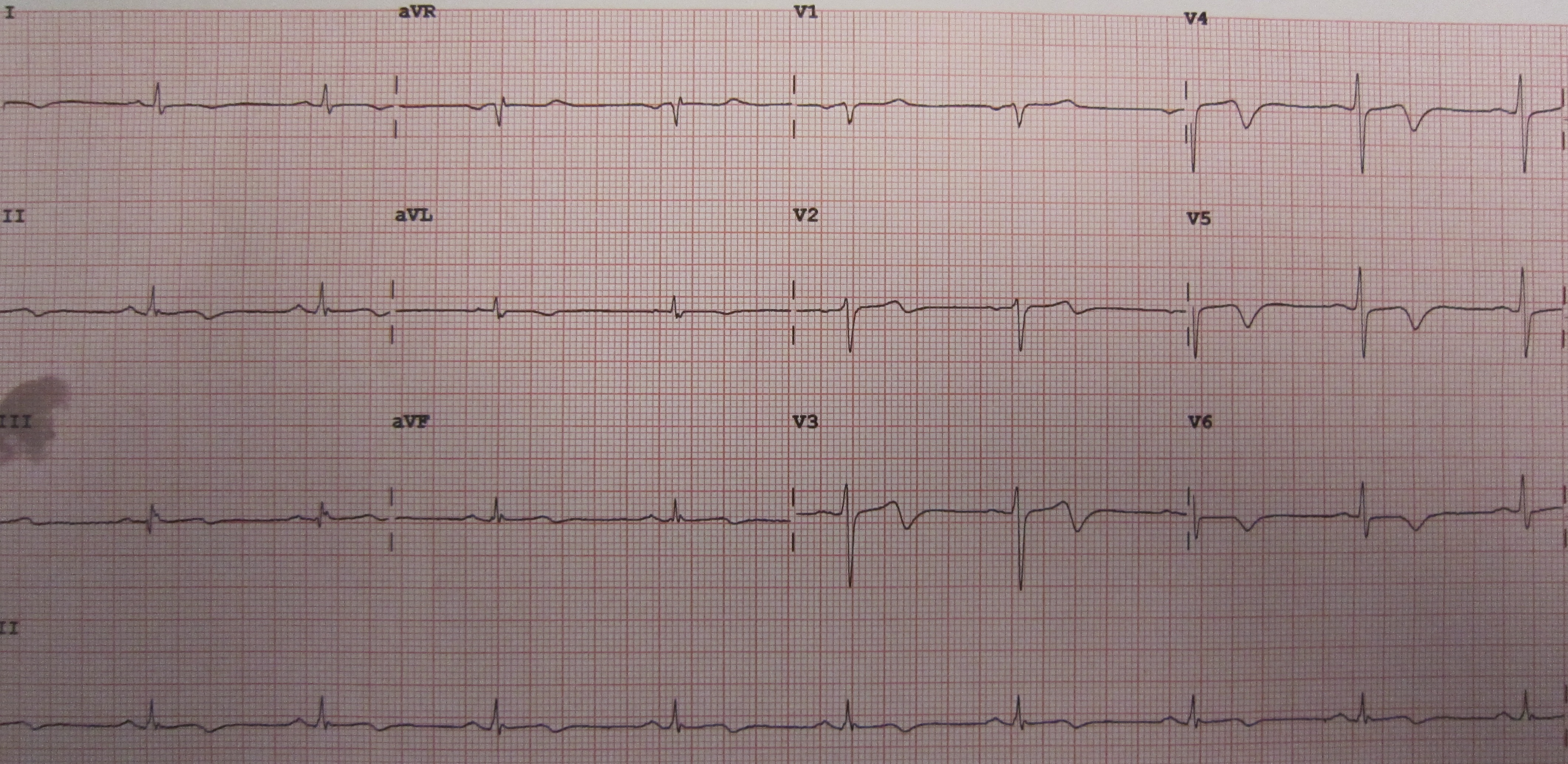
EKG/ECG of the same person when pain-free, note the biphasic T waves in leads V2 and V3
