= Wendy S. Post =

American cardiologist

- Born: New York, US
- Spouse: Roger Blumenthal (m. 1997)

Academic background
- Education: BA, Biology, 1986, Harvard College; M.S., Epidemiology, 1994, Harvard T.H. Chan School of Public Health; MD, 1990, Columbia University Vagelos College of Physicians and Surgeons

Academic work
- Institutions: Johns Hopkins University; Johns Hopkins Hospital

Wendy Susan Post is an American cardiologist. She is the Director of Cardiovascular Research for the Division of Cardiology and Director of Research for the Hopkins Cardiovascular Fellowship Training Program.

== Early life and education ==
Post was born in New York to HR executive Paula and dentist Arthur S. Post. She graduated from Harvard University with a Bachelor of Science degree in Biology and Master's degree in public health before earning her Medical degree from Columbia University. While completing her medical training at Johns Hopkins University, Post married Roger Blumenthal.

== Career ==
Post led research published in 1999 on the effects of estrogen in preventing heart disease in post-menopausal women.

Post was appointed to associate faculty at the Welch Center for Prevention, Epidemiology, and Clinical Research, at Johns Hopkins University (JHU). In June 2013, Post was appointed to the rank of Full professor and she co-led the first large-scale genome-wide association study to uncover a genetic link to aortic valve calcification. The study she led discovered that lipoprotein levels and common genetic variants in LPA lead to aortic valve calcification and aortic stenosis. The following year, she studied the presence and extent of plaque in the arteries of over 1,000 males to show a link between HIV infection and coronary artery disease. Post also continued to serve as the principal investigator for the Hopkins Field Center for the Multi-Ethnic Study of Atherosclerosis (MESA) and was elected to the American Society for Clinical Investigation.

In 2017, Post was selected to join the inaugural group of the Mary Elizabeth Garrett Executive Leadership for Women Faculty Program. The following year, she was also selected to be Director of Cardiovascular Research for the entire Division of Cardiology at JHU.
