= Yaariv Khaykin =

Canadian cardiologist

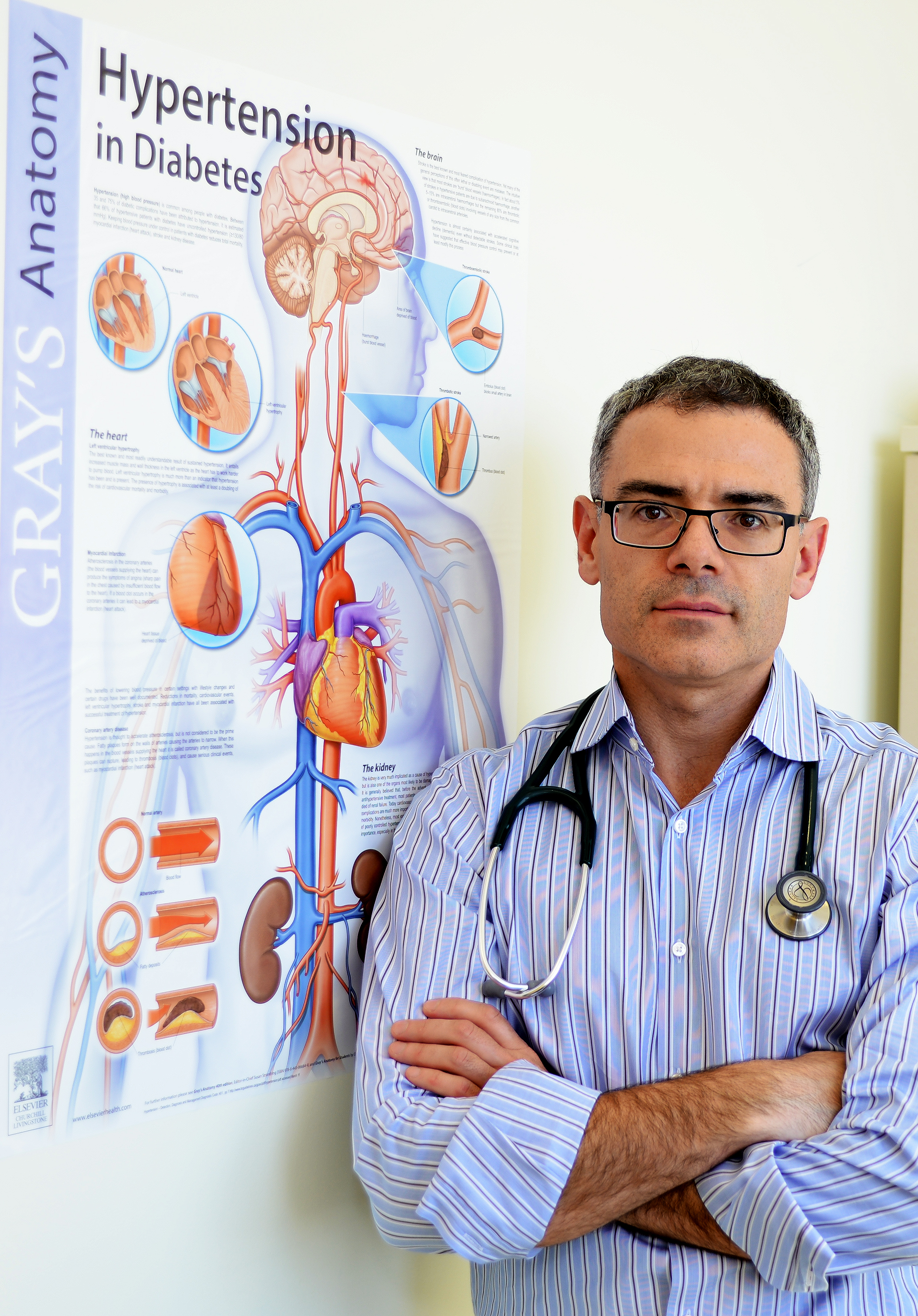
- Occupation: Cardiologist
- Known for: Research into complex ablation for atrial fibrillation

Yaariv Khaykin is a Canadian cardiologist and cardiac electrophysiologist specializing in arrhythmia management, digital health, and cardiac data systems. He serves as Chief Medical Information Officer at Southlake Regional Health Centre and Chief Medical Officer at Myant Health, and is an Associate Professor of Medicine at the University of Toronto. His work focuses on cardiac electrophysiology, clinical informatics, and the integration of digital technologies into cardiovascular care.

== Education ==
Khaykin pursued his undergraduate studies in molecular genetics and biology at the University of Toronto before entering medical school. He earned his Doctor of Medicine (MD) from the University of Toronto in 1996.

He completed postgraduate training in general internal medicine and cardiology at the University of Toronto, including serving as Chief Cardiology Resident at Sunnybrook Health Sciences Centre. He subsequently undertook a fellowship in cardiac electrophysiology at the Cleveland Clinic Foundation in the United States.

He has also completed additional professional training, including a Physician Leadership Certificate from the Ontario Medical Association.

== Career ==
Khaykin has held multiple clinical, academic, and leadership roles in cardiology and health systems innovation. Since 2004, he has served as a staff cardiologist and electrophysiologist at Southlake Regional Health Centre in Newmarket, Ontario, where he later became Chief Medical Information Officer from 2014 to present.

Since 2012, he is the founder and CEO of PACE Cardiology and director of the Newmarket Electrophysiology Research Group since 2005. In 2024, he was appointed Chief Medical Officer of Myant Health, focusing on digital health technologies and remote monitoring solutions.

In academia, Khaykin has been affiliated with the University of Toronto since 2010, serving as Assistant Professor before being promoted to Associate Professor in 2025. He also holds an adjunct research professorship at Western University.

Earlier in his career, he contributed to regional cardiology initiatives, including leading the York–Simcoe–Muskoka Arrhythmia Management and Guidelines Project, which developed standardized referral and care pathways. He has also been involved in physician education and industry-supported electrophysiology training programs.

== Research ==
Khaykin's research focuses on cardiac electrophysiology, arrhythmia management, and the application of digital technologies in cardiovascular care. His work has included the development of cardiac data management systems, clinical decision-support tools, and regional care models for arrhythmia treatment.

He has led initiatives integrating clinical informatics into cardiology practice, particularly in the use of electronic medical records, standardized order sets, and remote monitoring systems to improve patient outcomes. His research also addresses evidence-based approaches to atrial fibrillation management, catheter ablation strategies, and healthcare system optimization through data-driven methodologies.

== Selected publications ==
- Yaariv Khaykin; Matthew R. Reynolds; et al. (January 2014). "Cost-effectiveness of cryoballoon ablation for the management of paroxysmal atrial fibrillation". Europace. 16 (5): 652–659. doi:10.1093/europace/eut380. PMID 24390386.
- Yaariv Khaykin; Zachary WM. Laksman; et al. (January 2014). "Higher Mortality Risk Among Patients With Delayed Follow-Up After Implantable Cardioverter Defibrillator Procedures". The Canadian Journal of Cardiology.
- Yaariv Khaykin; Stephen B. Wilton; et al. (January 2014). "Left Ventricular Lead Position and Outcomes in the Resynchronization-Defibrillation for Ambulatory Heart Failure Trial (RAFT)". The Canadian Journal of Cardiology. 30 (4): 413–419. doi:10.1016/j.cjca.2013.10.009. PMID 24561009.
- Yaariv Khaykin; Roberto Mantovan; et al. (August 2013). "Relationship of Quality of Life With Procedural Success of Atrial Fibrillation (AF) Ablation and Postablation AF Burden: Substudy of the STAR AF Randomized Trial". The Canadian Journal of Cardiology.
- Yaariv Khaykin; Derek Yung; et al. (June 2013). "Survival after implantable cardioverter-defibrillator implantation in the elderly". Circulation. 127 (24): 2383–92. doi:10.1161/circulationaha.113.001442. PMID 23775193. S2CID 81757938.
- Khaykin, Yaariv; Shamiss, Yana (2011). "Cost of AF Ablation: Where Do We Stand?". Cardiology Research and Practice. 2011: 1–6. doi:10.4061/2011/589781. PMC 3051175. PMID 21403880.
- Yaariv Khaykin; et al. (2009). "A Randomized Controlled Trial of the Efficacy and Safety of Electroanatomic Circumferential Pulmonary Vein Ablation Supplemented by Ablation of Complex Fractionated Atrial Electrograms Versus Potential-Guided Pulmonary Vein Antrum Isolation Guided by Intracardiac Ultrasound". Circulation: Arrhythmia and Electrophysiology. 2 (5): 481–487. doi:10.1161/circep.109.848978. PMID 19843915.
- Yaariv Khaykin; et al. (2009). "Cost Comparison of Ablation Versus Antiarrhythmic Drugs As First-Line Therapy for Atrial Fibrillation: An Economic Evaluation of the RAAFT Pilot Study". Journal of Cardiovascular Electrophysiology. 20 (1): 7–12. doi:10.1111/j.1540-8167.2008.01303.x. PMID 18803564. S2CID 19158734.
- Yaariv Khaykin; et al. (2008). "Real-time integration of 2D intracardiac echocardiography and 3D electroanatomical mapping to guide ventricular tachycardia ablation". Heart Rhythm. 5 (10): 1396–1402. doi:10.1016/j.hrthm.2008.06.025. PMID 18929326.
- Yaariv Khaykin; et al. (September 2007). "Cost Comparison of Catheter Ablation and Medical Therapy in Atrial Fibrillation". Journal of Cardiovascular Electrophysiology. 18 (9): 907–913. doi:10.1111/j.1540-8167.2007.00902.x. PMID 17666065. S2CID 1415167.
- Khaykin, Yaariv; Saad, Eduardo B.; Wilkoff, Bruce L. (2003). "Pacing in heart failure: the benefit of resynchronization". Cleveland Clinic Journal of Medicine. 70 (10): 841–865. doi:10.3949/ccjm.70.10.841. PMID 14621231.
- Yaariv Khaykin; Derek V. Exner; et al. "Risk Estimation Following Infarction Noninvasive Evaluation - ICD Efficacy". University of Calgary, Alberta Innovation and Science, Medtronic, GE Healthcare.
