= Georg Klein (composer) =

German media artist and composer (born 1964)

Georg Klein (born 1 March 1964) is a German artist and composer based in Berlin, Germany. He has lived in Rome, Los Angeles, and Istanbul. He has worked in the fields of sound, video, and media production.

Klein is a professor of sound art and director of the master's program of Sound Studies and Sonic Arts at the University of the Arts, Berlin.

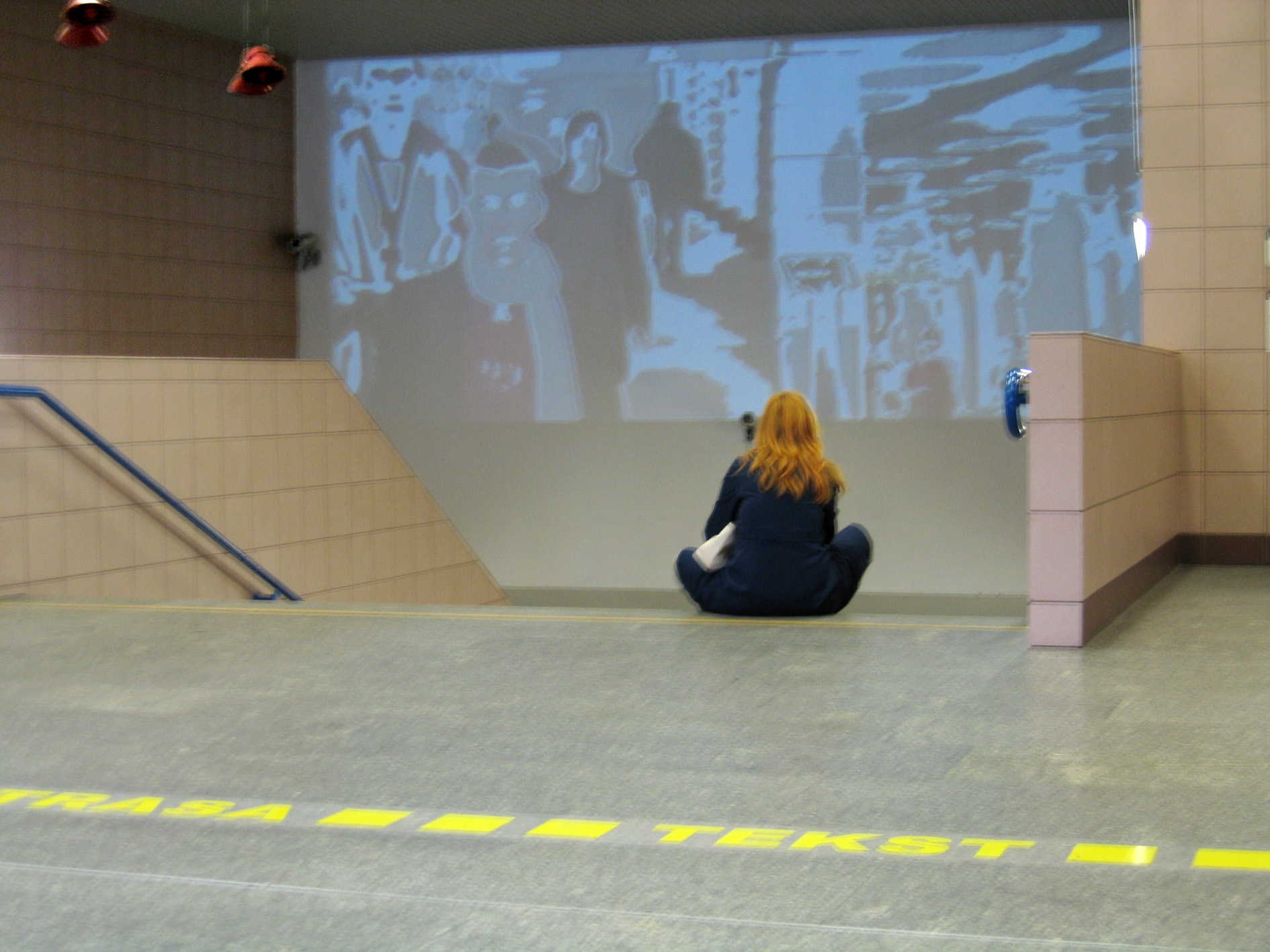
Interactive Sound-Video-Installation TRASA, simultaneously in Warsaw and Berlin

== Early life ==
Georg Klein was born in 1964 in Öhringen, Germany. Klein began his creative studies in sound engineering and communication at the Technical University of Munich before continuing his education at the Technische Universität Berlin. He continued his education by studying the philosophy of religion, psychoanalysis, and ethnomusicology at the Freie Universität Berlin.

From 1991 to 1994, Klein worked as a research assistant at the Technische Universität Berlin. He focused on visualizing sound for the deaf. In both 1999 and 2000, he lectured at the Freie Universität Berlin on the relationship of music and religion.

== Career ==
=== Transition to Composition and Sound Art ===
In 1996, he began working as a music composer (Berlin International Film Festival) and in the following years worked in the Electronic Studio of TU Berlin on electronic and computer music. In 2001, he began focusing on public installations, such as Transition and Ortsklang Marl Mitte, which won the German Sound Art Award in 2002. From 2001 to 2005, he was chairman of the Berlin Society of New Music (BSNM), a forum dedicated to issues related to production and reception aesthetics, as well as cultural policy in contemporary music. He later began to incorporate video into his work.

=== KlangQuadrat and Public Installations ===
In 2003, Klein and Julia Gerlach established KlangQuadrat (Sound Square), an office for sound and media art. Their projects have received support from the Capital Cultural Fund in Berlin, the Goethe-Institut, the German Foreign Office, the German-Polish Foundation, and the Schering Foundation. TRASA (2004/2006), a mixed media installation that played simultaneously in Warsaw and Berlin, connected the cities for two months (part of a "Bi-medial Space of Contact" series in six cities of Europe). He created interactive media art at urban places such as subway entrance halls. With the Swiss performance artist Steffi Weismann, he created installations such as pickup in 2005, takeaway in 2006, venture doll in 2008, and UNorJUSTNESS A+B in 2013. In his installation turmlaute. 2: Watch Tower (2007/2014), he simulated the founding of a political organization.

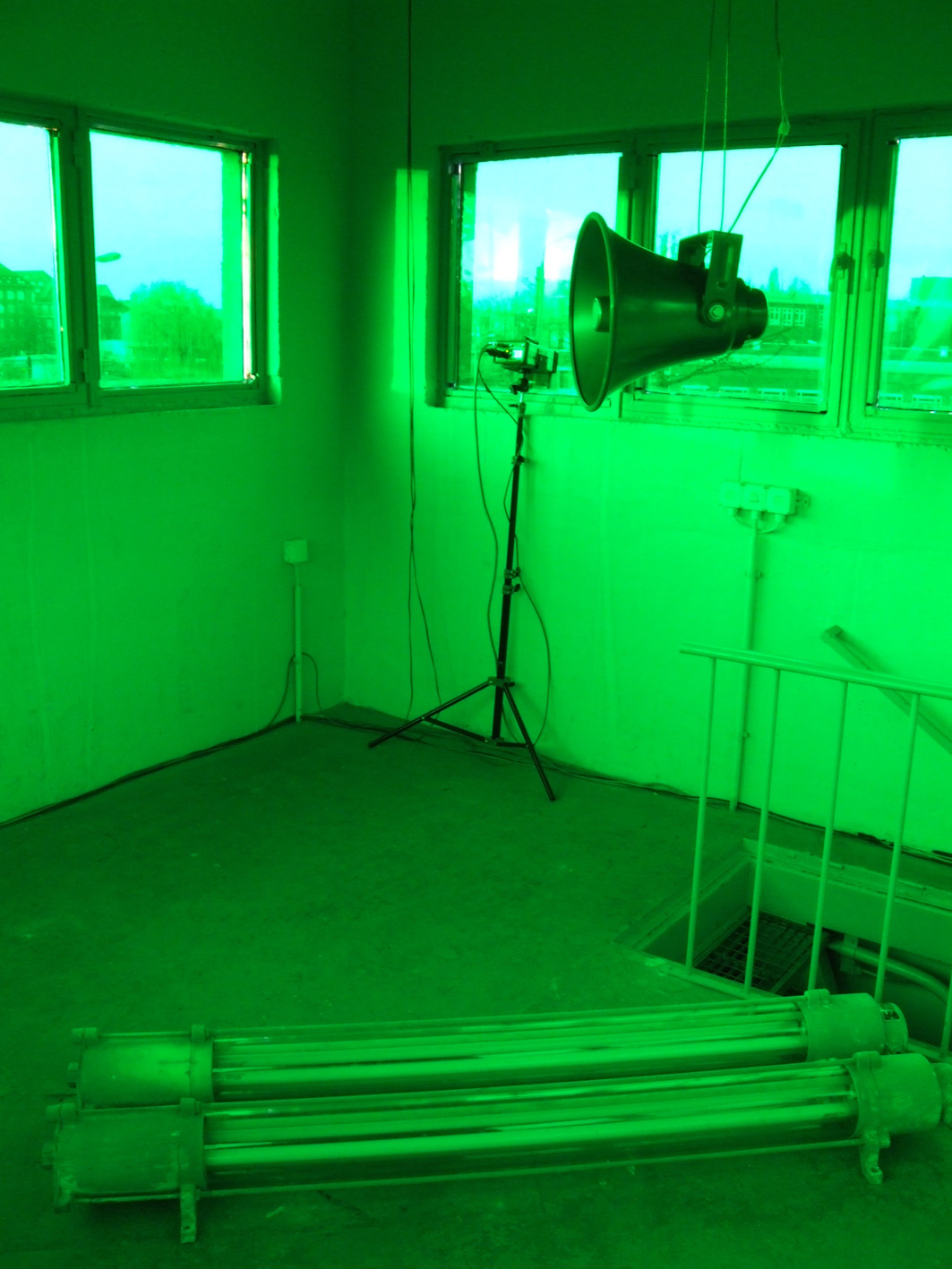
Interactive Sound-Video-Installation turmlaute.2 in a watch tower at the former Berlin Wall

=== Projects Addressing Borders and Social Themes ===
In 2009, Klein created Sprich mit mir, a site-specific research and interactive installation in the red-light district of Braunschweig, and RamallahTours, a car and travel agency installation in Israel, the latter examining legitimacy in public space and the internet. In 2010, Klein presented a dual audio-visual installation on assassins in Berlin and Istanbul titled cuts and creeds. He also explored borders, as seen in his exhibition borderlines and his ongoing work tracing Godwin with an illegal immigrant from Nigeria appearing in the streets of different European cities. With his works GNADE / MERCY (Mannheim, 2012), installed in front of banks and job centers, UNzuRECHT / UNorJUSTICE (Switzerland, 2013), and toposonie: spree (Berlin, 2013), he addressed social themes.

In 2015, he received a prize at the Dialogue Award of the Federal Ministry of Foreign Affairs, Germany, for his project European Border Watch Organisation at the European Media Art Festival in Osnabrück. According to the jury (Abina Manning, Olaf Stüber, Peter Zorn): "The European Border Watch encourages us to police the borders ourselves from the comfort of our homes. This project forces us to strengthen our own arguments and be continually vigilant against the slippery slide of fanatical ideas." 'Borders and Migration' are also the main topic in following works like Deep Difference Unit (Daegu, South Korea 2016), Grün Hören / Listening Green (Berlin, 2017) and The Sound before Silence - Souvenirs from North Korea (Berlin, 2018). In 2020, he received the Audio Walk Award for his soundwalk toposonie::engelbecken, which connects historical radio testimonies with the present. His audiovisual installation Dark Matter (2021) traces the development of hate speech in radical right-wing music and propaganda and ends with the attack in Halle (Saale) in the 2019 Halle synagogue shooting.

=== Curatorial Work and Lectures ===
Klein has organized and curated various events and exhibitions, as well as chaired the Berlin Society of New Music (BGNM) (2001–2005). He co-founded the Errant Bodies group Berlin (since 2013, now: Errant Sound), curated at the MuseumsQuartier Vienna ("Post Colonial Flagship Store" PCFS, 2014) and the DYSTOPIE - sound art festival, 2018, funded by Senate of Berlin, and 2020, financed by Kulturstiftung des Bundes. Since 1998, he has lectured both in Germany and internationally, and has published essays on sound and media art as well as on art in public space. He has conducted workshops at institutions including the Berlin University of the Arts (UdK / Sound Studies), Istanbul Bilgi University, and, in 2015, the Karlsruhe University of Arts and Design (HfG Karlsruhe). Since 2013, he has held a lectureship in General Studies at the Berlin University of the Arts and currently serves as Professor of Sound Art and Director of the Master’s Program in Sound Studies and Sonic Arts.

== Artistic Practice ==
Klein's artistic practice uses sound, video, text, and photography. His installations and interventions— particularly those in public spaces— integrate visual, acoustic, situational, and political concepts. These installations often incorporate visitor involvement, either through interactive or participatory means.

Klein's work focuses on the relationship between specific sites and social or political contradictions. A recurring theme in his practice is the concept of borders, which he explores through both psychological and public lenses. His projects often use audio-visual elements and artistic fabrication to examine the boundaries between art and reality, aiming to encourage audience reflection on these themes.

In recent years, the artistic debate on power in politics and the economy has been a focus of Klein's artistic and curatorial work. His work in both physical space and public media has provoked reactions from the public and the press.

Art critic Sabine Sanio points out the interest of Klein on social reality and urban space, noting that Klein prioritizes auditory elements within site-specific contexts.

== Awards ==
- Audio Walk Award, Germany (2020)
- 1st prize IGA Sound Art Competition 2017, Berlin
- EMAF Dialogue Award of the Federal Ministry of Foreign Affairs, European Media Art Festival, Germany (2015)
- Medien-Raum-Award 2006, Skulpturenmuseum Marl / NRW (2006)
- Deutscher Klangkunstpreis / German Sound Art Award WDR / Skulpturenmuseum Marl / NRW (2002)
- Gustav-Mahler Composition Prize Austria (1999)

== Works (selection) ==
- 3 new nurses, 3-part sound installation in Schwesternpark Witten (Wittener Tage für zeitgen. Musik, Witten 2022)
- passage, Interactive sound installation under a traffic bridge (intraregionale, Burgdorf/Hannover 2021)
- Dark Matter, Immersive Sound-Video-Installation (Errant Sound, Berlin 2021)
- The Sound before Silence, sound and video installation with objects (Berlin 2018)
- Fog Zone, audiovisual installation in a fog space, DYSTOPIE - sound art festival (Berlin 2018)
- Grün Hören / Listening Green, permanent sound installation at IGA / Gardens of the World (Berlin 2017)
- Deep Difference Unit, sound sculpture, Art Biennale Daegu (South Korea 2016)
- ungrounded, walk-in space bubble with interactive installation (Hannover 2016)
- European Border Watch Organizations, European Media Art Festival EMAF (Osnabrueck, 2015)
- The Interactive Piano, installation, Festival Klangwerkstatt, Sophiensaele (Berlin, 2014)
- PCFS - Post Colonial Flagship Store, in coop. with Sven Kalden, Exhibition at MuseumsQuartier (Wien, 2014)
- toposonie::spree, sound Walk with smartphone app (Berlin 2013)
- UNzuRECHT A + B, in coop. with Steffi Weismann, installation and performance, Schlossmediale Werdenberg (Switzerland, 2013)
- GNADE / MERCY, intervention in public space and media altar of mercy (Nationaltheater Mannheim, 2012)
- tracing Godwin, participative poster action, Europe, since 2011
- mirror songs, installation at a prison facade (Turkey, Sinopale III, 2010)
- Cuts and Creeds – Young, male assassins in an oriental-occidental perspective, (Berlin/Istanbul, 2010)
- RamallahTours, installation with a travel agency (Umm El Fahem / Tel Aviv, Exhibition "29km" 2009)
- Sprich mit mir, interactive sound installation(Konsumverein, Braunschweig 2009)
- venture doll, in coop. with Steffi Weismann, (Los Angeles 2008)
- sonic parole, Media Facades Festival (Berlin 2008)
- meta.stasen, tram installation (Europ. Zentrum der Künste Hellerau, Dresden 2007)
- turmlaute.2: Wachturm, border project Festival MaerzMusik (Berlin 2007)
- turmlaute.1: Hungerturm, sound and video installation (Rome, German Academy Villa Massimo/Casa Baldi, 2006)
- takeaway, in Koop. mit Steffi Weismann, installationsonambiente Intern. Klangkunstfestival (Berlin 2006)
- sixis, für Sextett mit Spiegelsextett (Berlin 2006)
- DADAyama, in coop. with Tetsuo Furodate (Berlin 2006)
- pickup – Intervention at a Kiosk, in Koop. mit Steffi Weismann (Bern 2005)
- TRASA warszawa-berlin, Ein bimedialer Kontaktraum, (Warschau-Berlin 2004)
- PeerGynt – stage music/conductor, (Berliner Ensemble, director: Peter Zadek, 2004-2008)
- Imperial News, (Rotes Rathaus Berlin 2003, Stiftung Kulturfonds)
- wel-come, sound installation (Schloss Wiepersdorf)
- Ortsklang Marl Mitte – blaues blach – VielKunst.WenigArbeit, (Deutscher Klangkunstpreis 2002)
- transition – berlin junction, interactive sound installation (Philharmonie Berlin, 2001/2002)
- Li.. und die Erde I+II, (Intern. Gustav-Mahler-Kompositionspreis 1999)
- amor fati, (film music, Intern. Filmfestspiele Berlin 1997)

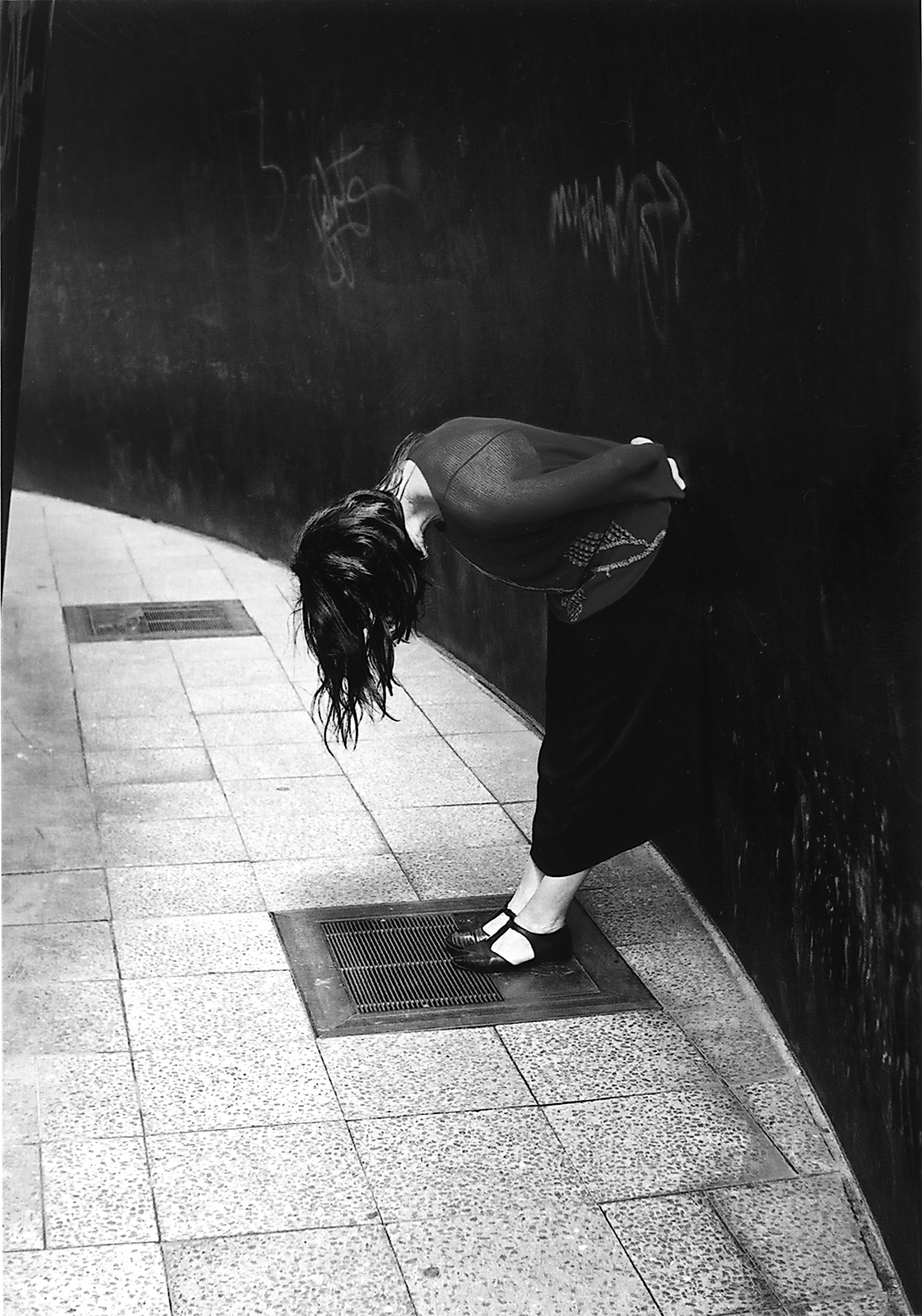
Interactive sound installation transition in the sculpture berlin junction by Richard Serra

== Catalogs or reviews ==
- Errant Sound Reader - Thoughts and Practies from the Berlin Artist-Run Space, Ed. Mario Asef, Golo Föllmer, Georg Klein, Brandon LaBelle, Errant Bodies Press 2025, ISBN 978-3-9825585-6-1
- borderlines - Auf der Grenze, Thematic catalog of works of George Klein, Ed. S.Sanio, German/English, Kehrer 2014, ISBN 978-3-86828-520-8
- Drehung im Kopf, George Klein. In: Neue Zeitschrift für Musik, Heft 5-2014, Ed. Rolf W. Stoll, Schott Music 2014, ISSN 0945-6945
- BLICK-Interview by Barbara Kepa with George Klein, English, Berliner Pool, 2013
- Gratwanderung zwischen Kunst und Politik 2012, Stefan Fricke / George Klein, In: MusikTexte, Issue 135, ISSN 0178-8884
- Stadtkunst als Bild, Text, Klang 2011, George Klein Sprich mit mir, In: KUNSTFORUM International, Issue 212: res publica 2.0, Hg. Paolo Bianchi.
- Don't call it art! – On strategies of media art in public space, ISEA 2010 Ruhr Conference Proceedings, Ed. J.Funke, A.Broeckmann et.al., Revolver Berlin 2010, ISBN 978-3-86895-103-5
- 29 km Katalog Kunstgalerie Umm El Fahem, Ed. Shlomit Baumann, dt.-arab.-hebr., Jerusalem 2009
- klangstaetten|stadtklaenge Katalog+DVD, Ed. Allg. Konsumverein e.V., dt.-engl., Braunschweig 2009
- Site-Sounds – On strategies of sound art in public space, In: Organised Sound 14/1, 2009 (Cambridge University Press), ISSN 1355-7718
- Deutsche Video-Kunst / Medien-Raum-Wettbewerb 2006-2008, Katalog, ISBN 978-3-924790-80-6
- sonambiente Klangkunstfestival Katalog, 2006, ISBN 978-3-936636-93-2
- The Making of Alex Katalog Urban Art Stories, 2005, ISBN 3-86588-127-0
- transition – berlin junction, eine klangsituation Katalog, 2001, ISBN 3-89727-178-8
- Deutscher Klangkunstpreis Katalog, 2002, ISBN 3-924790-62-0
- TRASA warszawa-berlin Katalog, 2004, ISBN 3-936636-43-5
- Electronic in New Music 2006, ISBN 978-3-936000-15-3
- Unter freiem Himmel – Klangkunst im öffentlichen Raum In: musik|politik, BGNM-Jahrbuch 2002, ISBN 3-89727-257-1
- From the sound installation to the sound situation In: Organised Sound 8/2, 2003 (Cambridge University Press), ISSN 1355-7718
- Kazuo Uehara Sound Art in re-unioned City of Berlin. Osaka Univers. Journal of Arts No.18, 2002
- Christa Brüstle: TRASA – Kontaktraum zwischen Warschau und Berlin. In: Positionen 62 (Mühlenbeck b. Berlin, 2005)
- Barbara Barthelmes: Georg Klein oder der Künstler als Orts-Seher. In: Katalog TRASA warszawa-berlin. Kehrer-Verlag, Heidelberg, 2004, ISBN 3-936636-43-5
- Doris Kolesch: Gehör-Gänge – Zu George Klein's Klangsituation "transition" in Richard Serras Skulptur "Berlin Junction". Art lecture 2002. SFB Kulturen des Performativen, Freie Universität Berlin
- Sabine Sanio: im vorübergehen? kunst und eingedenken In: textbuch transition, Pfau-Verlag (Saarbrücken, 2001), ISBN 3-89727-178-8
