= Mark Josephson =

American cardiologist and writer

Mark E. Josephson Professor
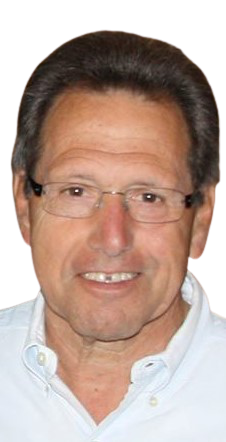
- Mark E. Josephson
- Born: January 27, 1943
- Died: January 11, 2017 (aged 73)
- Citizenship: United States
- Education: Trinity College, Columbia University College of Physicians and Surgeons
- Known for: "Clinical Cardiac Electrophysiology: Techniques and Interpretations" authorship, "Wellens and Josephson Advanced ECG" course
- Title: Herman Dana Professor of Medicine at Harvard Medical School, Chief of Cardiology at Beth Israel Deaconess Medical Center, Director of Harvard-Thorndike Electrophysiology Institute and Arrhythmia Service
- Scientific career
- Fields: Cardiac electrophysiology
- Workplaces: Beth Israel Deaconess Medical Center, Harvard Medical School

Mark E. Josephson (1943-2017) was an American cardiologist and writer, who was in the 1970s one of the American pioneers of the medical cardiology subspecialty of cardiac electrophysiology. His book titled Clinical Cardiac Electrophysiology: Techniques and Interpretations is widely acknowledged as the definitive treatment of the discipline. He served as Herman Dana Professor of Medicine at Harvard Medical School, director of the Harvard-Thorndike Electrophysiology Institute and Arrhythmia Service and the chief of cardiology at Harvard University's Beth Israel Deaconess Medical Center in Boston.

== Career ==
Josephson was a graduate of Trinity College in Connecticut and subsequently went to medical school at Columbia University College of Physicians and Surgeons. He completed his residency training in Internal Medicine at Mount Sinai Hospital in New York City and his cardiology fellowship at the Perelman School of Medicine at the University of Pennsylvania.

After spending two years as a research associate with Anthony Damato at the Staten Island Public Health Service Hospital, he published articles on the electrophysiologic basis and anatomic location of AV nodal reentry and map-guided subendocardial resection to cure ventricular tachycardia, a procedure Time dubbed "the Pennsylvania Peel" in honor of the Penn cardiology department's surgical innovation. Josephson's work helped to transform electrophysiology from a research field to a powerful clinical discipline for treating patients.

Josephson has published over 400 original journal articles and 200 book chapters and reviews and is the author of the textbook of clinical cardiac electrophysiology, Clinical Cardiac Electrophysiology: Techniques and Interpretations. First published in 1979, the book has run to seven editions.

Josephson worked closely over the years with European cardiac electrophysiology pioneer Hein Wellens, chief of cardiology emeritus at the University of Limburg in Maastricht, Netherlands. For over 30 years, they coached together at high-yield "How to Approach Complex Arrhythmias" course for cardiologists and EP fellows. In the 2000s, they initiated an advanced course "Intracardiac Unknowns" which was attended by most electrophysiology trainees in the USA for over 10 years.

== Awards ==
Throughout his career Josephson won numerous awards. This includes the Career Achievement Award from the University of California San Francisco Medical School as well as the University Medal for Excellence from Columbia University as well as the Distinguished Teacher Award. He has been given the Pioneer Award in Cardiac Pacing and Electrophysiology from the Heart Rhythm Society. He also received the American Heart Association's Paul Dudley White Award and the Eugene Braunwald Academic Mentorship Award.

== Personal ==
Josephson and his wife, Joan, married in 1967 and remained married until her death in June 2016. They had two children. He died on January 11, 2017, from cancer, leaving behind two daughters: Rachael and Stephanie Josephsons.
