= Amiran Revishvili =

Russian physician (born 1956)

- Амиран Ревишвили
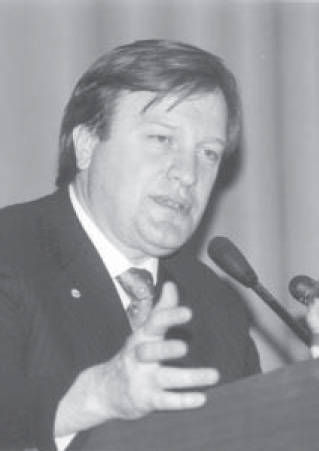
- Born: February 11, 1956 (age 70); Soviet Union
- Education: I.M. Sechenov Moscow Medical Academy
- Awards: Burakovski Award (2001), Honoured Scientist of Russian Federation (2006)
- Scientific career
- Fields: Cardiac surgery, cardiac electrophysiology
- Workplaces: Bakulev Scientific Center of Cardiovascular Surgery
- Doctoral advisor: Leo Bokeria

Amiran Shota Revishvili (Russian: Амиран Шотаевич Ревишвили, Georgian: ამირან რევიშვილი), born February 11, 1956, is a cardiac electrophysiologist, and Director, A.V. Vishnevsky Institute of Surgery in Moscow. He is president of the Russian Scientific Society of Clinical Electrophysiology, Arrhythmology and Cardiac Pacing, which is the Russian organizational member of the European Heart Rhythm Society network.

== Key positions and honours ==
- Pan-Russian Scientific Society of Clinical Electrophysiology, Arrhythmology and Cardiac Pacing, founding president
- Center of Surgical and Interventional Arrhythmology, Ministry of Health of the Russian Federation, executive director
- Department of Tachiarrhytmias, Bakulev Scientific Center of Cardiovascular Surgery, chief
- Russian Academy of Medical Sciences, member, 2011
- Russian Academy of Sciences, member, 2013
- State Prize of the Russian Federation, 2016
- American Association for Thoracic Surgery, member, 2017
