= Heart Rhythm Society =

- Founded: 1979
- Founder: Dr. J. Warren Harthorne; Dr. Victor Parsonnet; Dr. Seymour Furman; Dr. Dryden Morse
- Location: 1455 Pennsylvania Ave NW, Suite 400, Washington, DC, 20004, United States
- Region served: International
- Members: 9,000+
- Key people: Christina J. Wurster, MBA, CAE, CEO & Sana M. Al-Khatib, MD, MHS, FHRS, CCDS, President
- Employees: 50+
- Website: hrsonline.org
- Formerly called: North American Society of Pacing and Electrophysiology (NASPE)

The Heart Rhythm Society is an international non-profit organization that promotes education and advocacy for cardiac arrhythmia professionals and patients. The society was founded in 1979 and counted over 9,000 members from over 94 countries as of 2025. The official journal of the Heart Rhythm Society is Heart Rhythm, which provides readers scientific developments devoted to arrhythmias, devices, and cardiovascular electrophysiology. The Heart Rhythm Society is headquartered in Washington, DC, US.

== Awareness campaigns ==
=== Atrial Fibrillation Awareness Month ===
The Heart Rhythm Society, through its efforts during Atrial Fibrillation Awareness Month in September and throughout the year, is working to increase public knowledge about atrial fibrillation, including its symptoms, warning signs, and treatments.

=== Sudden Cardiac Arrest Awareness Month ===
Sudden Cardiac Arrest Awareness Month represents an initiative by the Heart Rhythm Society to raise awareness and help the public become more familiar with sudden cardiac arrest, how it affects people, and what can be done to help save lives. The society's award-winning "Apples and Oranges" campaign uses a simple analogy to educate people about the difference between a heart attack and sudden cardiac arrest. The campaign targets heart attack survivors, who are at the highest risk for sudden cardiac arrest, and stresses the importance of maintaining a healthy heart lifestyle and learning critical risk markers, especially their ejection fraction, which is the percentage of blood pumped out of the left ventricle with each heartbeat.

=== Arrest the Risk awareness campaign ===
In October 2012, the Heart Rhythm Society launched a multi-year, national awareness campaign, "Arrest the Risk", in an effort to elevate the issue of preventing sudden cardiac arrest, early intervention, and appropriate treatment among the African-American and Hispanic populations; increase awareness of disparities at the point of care; and reduce mortality and re-hospitalization rates from sudden cardiac arrest in the US.

== Activities ==
The Heart Rhythm Society's government advocacy efforts center on operating as an intermediary between regulatory agencies and its members. The society promotes programs to take action regarding legislation, creates and endorses clinical guidelines, and helps its members find funding opportunities from government agencies such as the National Institutes of Health.

The society also provides several educational initiatives including courses held throughout the year, certification and continuing medical education programs and an annual conference, called Scientific Sessions.

== Presidents ==
Presidents of the Heart Rhythm Society from inception are listed below. The leadership cycle is five years, with service as president being in the fourth year. This allows the society to project presidents three years in advance. Anne M. Gillis, whose election to the presidency for the 2012–13 term was revealed at the May 2009 meeting of the society, was the second non-American to serve in that capacity. The first non-American president was Bernard S. Goldman in 1982; the second was Anne M. Gillis (both are Canadian).
