= Ventricular fibrillation =

Rapid quivering of the ventricles of the heart

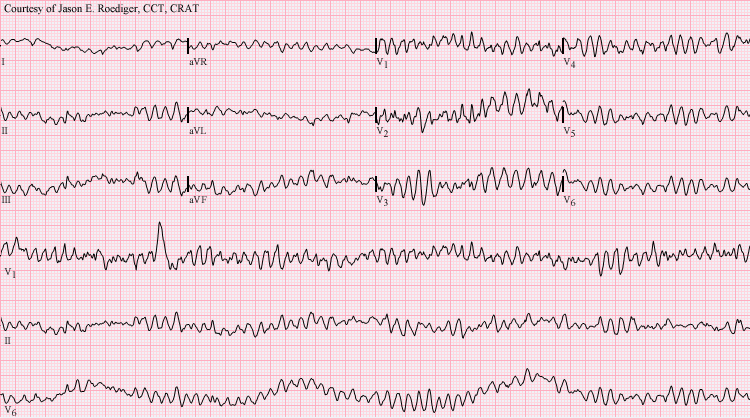
- 12-lead ECG showing ventricular fibrillation
- Specialty: Cardiology, Emergency Medicine
- Symptoms: Cardiac arrest with loss of consciousness and no pulse
- Causes: Coronary heart disease (including myocardial infarction), valvular heart disease, cardiomyopathy, Brugada syndrome, electric shock, long QT syndrome, intracranial hemorrhage
- Diagnostic method: Electrocardiogram
- Differential diagnosis: Torsades de pointes
- Treatment: Cardiopulmonary resuscitation (CPR) with defibrillation
- Prognosis: Survival rate 17% (out of hospital), 46% (in hospital)
- Frequency: ~10% of people in cardiac arrest

Ventricular fibrillation (V-fib or VF) is an abnormal heart rhythm in which the ventricles of the heart quiver. It is due to disorganized electrical activity. Ventricular fibrillation can cause cardiac arrest and loss of consciousness without pulse. This is followed by sudden cardiac death in the absence of treatment. Ventricular fibrillation is initially found in about 10% of people with cardiac arrest.

Ventricular fibrillation can occur due to coronary heart disease, valvular heart disease, cardiomyopathy, Brugada syndrome, long QT syndrome, electric shock, or intracranial hemorrhage. Diagnosis is by an electrocardiogram (ECG) showing irregular unformed QRS complexes without any clear P waves. An important differential diagnosis is torsades de pointes.

Treatment is with cardiopulmonary resuscitation (CPR) and defibrillation. Biphasic defibrillation may be better than monophasic. The medication epinephrine or amiodarone may be given if initial treatments are not effective. Rates of survival among those who are out of hospital when the arrhythmia is detected is about 17%, while for those in hospital it is about 46%.

== Signs and symptoms ==
Ventricular fibrillation is a cause of cardiac arrest. The ventricular muscle twitches randomly rather than contracting in a coordinated fashion (from the apex of the heart to the outflow of the ventricles), and so the ventricles fail to pump blood around the body – because of this, it is classified as a cardiac arrest rhythm, and patients in V-fib should be treated with cardiopulmonary resuscitation (CPR) and prompt defibrillation. Left untreated, ventricular fibrillation is rapidly fatal as the vital organs of the body, including the heart, are starved of oxygen. As a result, patients in this rhythm will not be conscious or responsive to stimuli. Coma and persistent vegetative state may also result. Prior to cardiac arrest, patients may complain of varying symptoms depending on the underlying cause. Patients may exhibit signs of agonal breathing, which to a layperson can look like normal spontaneous breathing, but is a sign of hypoperfusion of the brainstem.

It has an appearance on electrocardiography of irregular electrical activity with no discernable pattern. It may be described as "coarse" or "fine" depending on its amplitude, or as progressing from coarse to fine V-fib. Coarse V-fib may be more responsive to defibrillation, while fine V-fib can mimic the appearance of asystole on a defibrillator or cardiac monitor set to a low gain. Some clinicians may attempt to defibrillate fine V-fib in the hope that it can be reverted to a cardiac rhythm compatible with life, whereas others will deliver CPR and sometimes drugs as described in the advanced cardiac life support protocols in an attempt to increase its amplitude and the odds of successful defibrillation.

== Causes ==
Ventricular fibrillation has been described as "chaotic asynchronous fractionated activity of the heart" (Moe et al. 1964). A more complete definition is that ventricular fibrillation is a "turbulent, disorganized electrical activity of the heart in such a way that the recorded electrocardiographic deflections continuously change in shape, magnitude and direction".

Ventricular fibrillation most commonly occurs within diseased hearts, and, in the vast majority of cases, is a manifestation of underlying ischemic heart disease. Ventricular fibrillation is also seen in those with cardiomyopathy, myocarditis, and other heart pathologies. In addition, it is seen with electrolyte imbalance, overdoses of cardiotoxic drugs, and following near drowning or major trauma. It is also notable that ventricular fibrillation occurs where there is no discernible heart pathology or other evident cause, the so-called idiopathic ventricular fibrillation.

Idiopathic ventricular fibrillation occurs with a reputed incidence of approximately 1% of all cases of out-of-hospital arrest, as well as 3–9% of the cases of ventricular fibrillation unrelated to myocardial infarction, and 14% of all ventricular fibrillation resuscitations in patients under the age of 40. It follows then that, on the basis of the fact that ventricular fibrillation itself is common, idiopathic ventricular fibrillation accounts for an appreciable mortality. Recently described syndromes such as the Brugada Syndrome may give clues to the underlying mechanism of ventricular arrhythmias. In the Brugada syndrome, changes may be found in the resting ECG with evidence of right bundle branch block (RBBB) and ST elevation in the chest leads V1–V3, with an underlying propensity to sudden cardiac death.

The relevance of this is that theories of the underlying pathophysiology and electrophysiology must account for the occurrence of fibrillation in the apparent "healthy" heart. It is evident that there are mechanisms at work that we do not fully appreciate and understand. Investigators are exploring new techniques of detecting and understanding the underlying mechanisms of sudden cardiac death in these patients without pathological evidence of underlying heart disease.

Familial conditions that predispose individuals to developing ventricular fibrillation and sudden cardiac death are often the result of gene mutations that affect cellular transmembrane ion channels. For example, in Brugada Syndrome, sodium channels are affected. In certain forms of long QT syndrome, the potassium inward rectifier channel is affected.

In 1899, it was also found that ventricular fibrillation was, typically, the ultimate cause of death when the electric chair was used.

== Pathophysiology ==
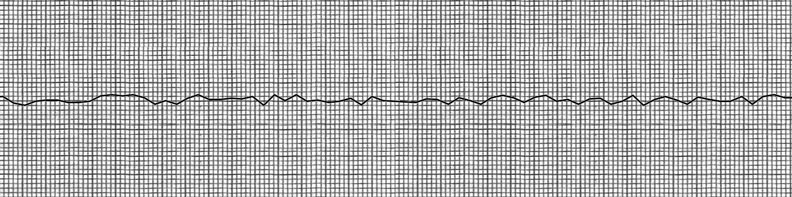
Fine ventricular fibrillation as seen on a rhythm strip

Ultrasound confirmation of above rhythm strip

Log-log graph of the effect of alternating current I of duration T passing from left hand to feet as defined in IEC publication 60479–1. AC-1: imperceptible AC-2: perceptible but no muscle reaction AC-3: muscle contraction with reversible effects AC-4: possible irreversible effects AC-4.1: up to 5% probability of ventricular fibrillation AC-4.2: 5–50% probability of fibrillation AC-4.3: over 50% probability of fibrillation

=== Abnormal automaticity ===
Automaticity is a measure of the propensity of a fiber to initiate an impulse spontaneously. The product of a hypoxic myocardium can be hyperirritable myocardial cells. These may then act as pacemakers. The ventricles are then being stimulated by more than one pacemaker. Scar and dying tissue is inexcitable, but around these areas usually lies a penumbra of hypoxic tissue that is excitable. Ventricular excitability may generate re-entry ventricular arrhythmia.

Most myocardial cells with an associated increased propensity to arrhythmia development have an associated loss of membrane potential. That is, the maximum diastolic potential is less negative and therefore exists closer to the threshold potential. Cellular depolarisation can be due to a raised external concentration of potassium ions K^{+}, a decreased intracellular concentration of sodium ions Na^{+}, increased permeability to Na^{+}, or a decreased permeability to K^{+}. The ionic basic automaticity is the net gain of an intracellular positive charge during diastole in the presence of a voltage-dependent channel activated by potentials negative to –50 to –60 mV.

Myocardial cells are exposed to different environments. Normal cells may be exposed to hyperkalaemia; abnormal cells may be perfused by normal environment. For example, with a healed myocardial infarction, abnormal cells can be exposed to an abnormal environment such as with a myocardial infarction with myocardial ischaemia. In conditions such as myocardial ischaemia, possible mechanism of arrhythmia generation include the resulting decreased internal K^{+} concentration, the increased external K^{+} concentration, norepinephrine release and acidosis. When myocardial cell are exposed to hyperkalemia, the maximum diastolic potential is depolarized as a result of the alteration of Ik1 potassium current, whose intensity and direction is strictly dependent on intracellular and extracellular potassium concentrations. With Ik1 suppressed, an hyperpolarizing effect is lost and therefore there can be activation of funny current even in myocardial cells (which is normally suppressed by the hyperpolarizing effect of coexisting potassium currents). This can lead to the instauration of automaticity in ischemic tissue.

=== Re-entry ===
The role of re-entry or circus motion was demonstrated separately by G. R. Mines and W. E. Garrey. Mines created a ring of excitable tissue by cutting the atria out of the ray fish. Garrey cut out a similar ring from the turtle ventricle. They were both able to show that, if a ring of excitable tissue was stimulated at a single point, the subsequent waves of depolarisation would pass around the ring. The waves eventually meet and cancel each other out, but, if an area of transient block occurred with a refractory period that blocked one wavefront and subsequently allowed the other to proceed retrogradely over the other path, then a self-sustaining circus movement phenomenon would result. For this to happen, however, it is necessary that there be some form of non-uniformity. In practice, this may be an area of ischemic or infarcted myocardium, or underlying scar tissue.

It is possible to think of the advancing wave of depolarisation as a dipole with a head and a tail. The length of the refractory period and the time taken for the dipole to travel a certain distance—the propagation velocity—will determine whether such a circumstance will arise for re-entry to occur. Factors that promote re-entry would include a slow-propagation velocity, a short refractory period with a sufficient size of ring of conduction tissue. These would enable a dipole to reach an area that had been refractory and is now able to be depolarised with continuation of the wavefront.

In clinical practice, therefore, factors that would lead to the right conditions to favour such re-entry mechanisms include increased heart size through hypertrophy or dilatation, drugs which alter the length of the refractory period and areas of cardiac disease. Therefore, the substrate of ventricular fibrillation is transient or permanent conduction block. Block due either to areas of damaged or refractory tissue leads to areas of myocardium for initiation and perpetuation of fibrillation through the phenomenon of re-entry.

=== Triggered activity ===
Triggered activity can occur due to the presence of afterdepolarisations. These are depolarising oscillations in the membrane voltage induced by preceding action potentials. These can occur before or after full repolarisation of the fiber and as such are termed either early (EADs) or delayed afterdepolarisations (DADs). All afterdepolarisations may not reach threshold potential, but, if they do, they can trigger another afterdepolarisation, and thus self-perpetuate.

==== Power spectrum ====
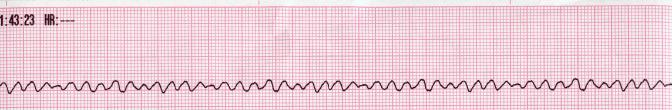
Ventricular fibrillation as seen in lead II

The distribution of frequency and power of a waveform can be expressed as a power spectrum in which the contribution of different waveform frequencies to the waveform under analysis is measured. This can be expressed as either the dominant or peak frequency, i.e., the frequency with the greatest power or the median frequency, which divides the spectrum in two halves.

Frequency analysis has many other uses in medicine and in cardiology, including analysis of heart rate variability and assessment of cardiac function, as well as in imaging and acoustics.

=== Histopathology ===
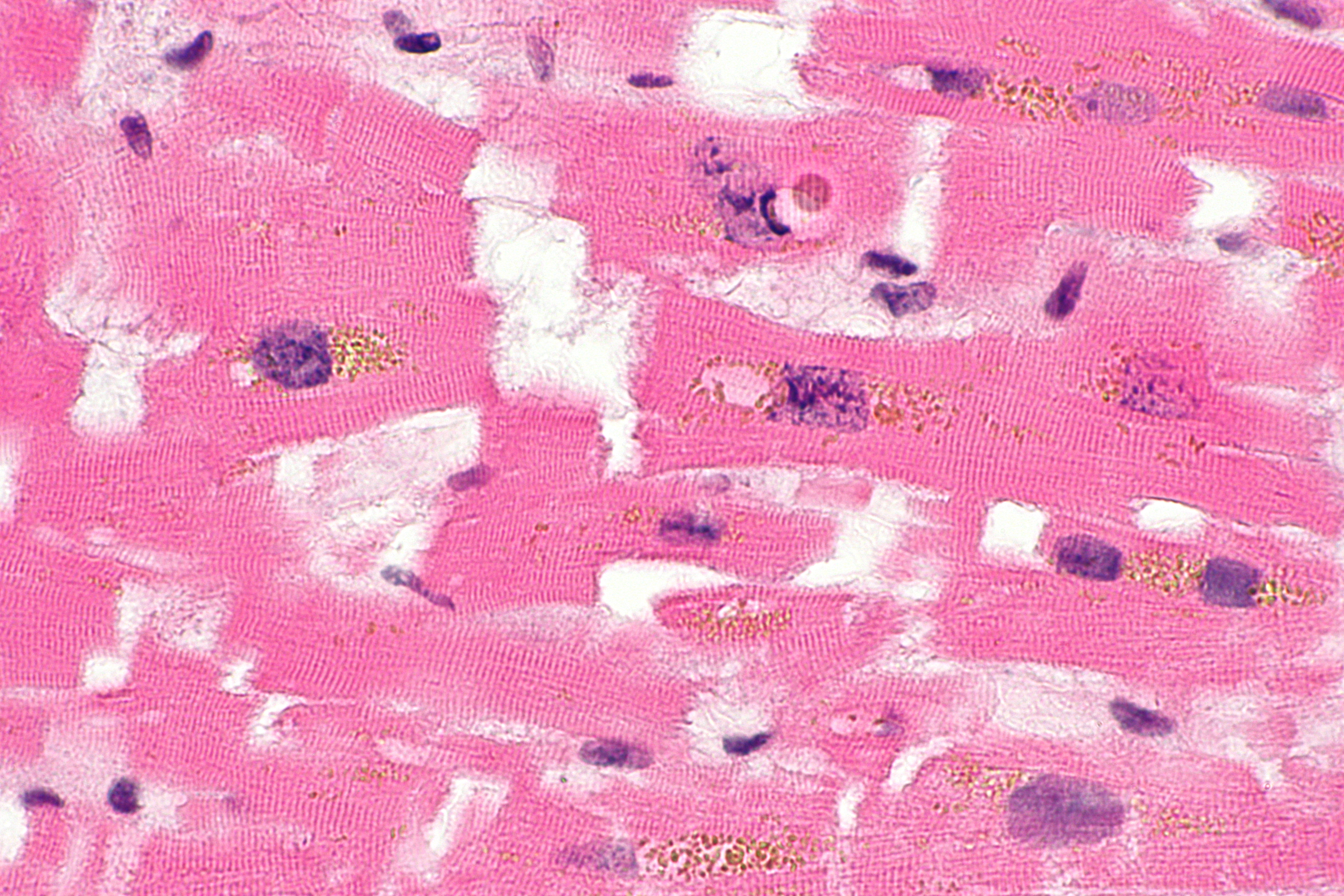
Micrograph showing myofibre break-up with squared nuclei, a morphologic correlate of ventricular fibrillation. H&E stain

Myofibre break-up, abbreviated MFB, is associated with ventricular fibrillation leading to death. Histomorphologically, MFB is characterized by fractures of the cardiac myofibres perpendicular to their long axis, with squaring of the myofibre nuclei.

== Treatment ==
Defibrillation is the definitive treatment of ventricular fibrillation, whereby an electrical current is applied to the ventricular mass either directly or externally through pads or paddles, with the aim of depolarising enough of the myocardium for coordinated contractions to occur again. The use of this is often dictated around the world by Advanced Cardiac Life Support or Advanced Life Support algorithms, which is taught to medical practitioners including doctors, nurses and paramedics and also advocates the use of drugs, predominantly epinephrine, after every second unsuccessful attempt at defibrillation, as well as cardiopulmonary resuscitation (CPR) between defibrillation attempts. Though ALS/ACLS algorithms encourage the use of drugs, they state first and foremost that defibrillation should not be delayed for any other intervention and that adequate cardiopulmonary resuscitation be delivered with minimal interruption.

The precordial thump is a manoeuver promoted as a mechanical alternative to defibrillation. Some advanced life support algorithms advocate its use once and only in the case of witnessed and monitored V-fib arrests as the likelihood of it successfully cardioverting a patient are small and this diminishes quickly in the first minute of onset.

People who survive a "V-fib arrest" and who make a good recovery are often considered for an implantable cardioverter-defibrillator, which can quickly deliver this same life-saving defibrillation should another episode of ventricular fibrillation occur outside a hospital environment.

== Epidemiology ==
Sudden cardiac arrest is the leading cause of death in the industrialised world. It exacts a significant mortality with approximately 70,000 to 90,000 sudden cardiac deaths each year in the United Kingdom, and survival rates are only 2%. The majority of these deaths are due to ventricular fibrillation secondary to myocardial infarction, or "heart attack". During ventricular fibrillation, cardiac output drops to zero, and, unless remedied promptly, death usually ensues within minutes.

== History ==
Lyman Brewer suggests that the first recorded account of ventricular fibrillation dates as far back as 1500 BC, and can be found in the Ebers papyrus of ancient Egypt. An extract, recorded 3500 years ago, states: "When the heart is diseased, its work is imperfectly performed: the vessels proceeding from the heart become inactive, so that you cannot feel them … if the heart trembles, has little power and sinks, the disease is advanced and death is near." A book authored by Jo Miles suggests that it may even go back farther. Tests done on frozen remains found in the Himalayas seemed fairly conclusive that the first known case of ventricular fibrillation dates back to at least 2500 BC.

Whether this is a description of ventricular fibrillation is debatable. The next recorded description occurs 3000 years later and is recorded by Vesalius, who described the appearance of "worm-like" movements of the heart in animals prior to death.

The significance and clinical importance of these observations and descriptions possibly of ventricular fibrillation were not recognised until John Erichsen in 1842 described ventricular fibrillation following the ligation of a coronary artery. Subsequent to this in 1850, fibrillation was described by Ludwig and Hoffa when they demonstrated the provocation of ventricular fibrillation in an animal by applying a "Faradic" (electrical) current to the heart.

In 1874, Edmé Félix Alfred Vulpian coined the term mouvement fibrillaire, a term that he seems to have used to describe both atrial and ventricular fibrillation. John A. MacWilliam, a physiologist who had trained under Ludwig and who subsequently became Professor of Physiology at the University of Aberdeen, gave an accurate description of the arrhythmia in 1887. This definition still holds today, and is interesting in the fact that his studies and description predate the use of electrocardiography. His description is as follows: "The ventricular muscle is thrown into a state of irregular arrhythmic contraction, whilst there is a great fall in the arterial blood pressure, the ventricles become dilated with blood as the rapid quivering movement of their walls is insufficient to expel their contents; the muscular action partakes of the nature of a rapid incoordinate twitching of the muscular tissue ... The cardiac pump is thrown out of gear, and the last of its vital energy is dissipated in the violent and the prolonged turmoil of fruitless activity in the ventricular walls." MacWilliam spent many years working on ventricular fibrillation and was one of the first to show that ventricular fibrillation could be terminated by a series of induction shocks through the heart.

The first electrocardiogram recording of ventricular fibrillation was by August Hoffman in a paper published in 1912. At this time, two other researchers, George Ralph Mines and Garrey, working separately, produced work demonstrating the phenomenon of circus movement and re-entry as possible substrates for the generation of arrhythmias. This work was also accompanied by Lewis, who performed further outstanding work into the concept of "circus movement".

Later milestones include the work by W. J. Kerr and W. L. Bender in 1922, who produced an electrocardiogram showing ventricular tachycardia evolving into ventricular fibrillation. The re-entry mechanism was also advocated by DeBoer, who showed that ventricular fibrillation could be induced in late systole with a single shock to a frog heart. The concept of "R on T ectopics" was further brought out by Katz in 1928. This was called the "vulnerable period" by Wiggers and Wegria in 1940, who brought to attention the concept of the danger of premature ventricular beats occurring on a T wave.

Another definition of VF was produced by Wiggers in 1940. He described ventricular fibrillation as "an incoordinate type of contraction which, despite a high metabolic rate of the myocardium, produces no useful beats. As a result, the arterial pressure falls abruptly to very low levels, and death results within six to eight minutes from anemia [ischemia] of the brain and spinal cord".

Spontaneous conversion of ventricular fibrillation to a more benign rhythm is rare in all but small animals. Defibrillation is the process that converts ventricular fibrillation to a more benign rhythm. This is usually by application of an electric shock to the myocardium and is discussed in detail in the relevant article.

== See also ==
- Atrial fibrillation
- Electric shock
- Flatline
- HMR 1883
- Osborn wave
- Re-entry ventricular arrhythmia
- Ventricular flutter
