= Hein Wellens =

Dutch cardiologist (1935–2020)

Hein J. J. Wellens Professor
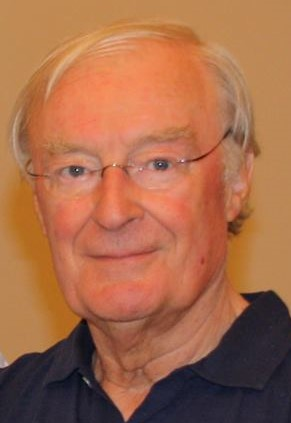
- Wellens in 2012
- Born: 13 November 1935; The Hague
- Died: 9 June 2020 (aged 84); Maastricht
- Citizenship: Dutch
- Education: University of Leiden
- Occupation: physician
- Known for: Wellens' syndrome
- Medical career
- Profession: cardiac electrophysiologist
- Field: cardiology
- Notable works: "The ECG in Emergency Decision Making" book

Henrick Joan Joost (Hein J. J. ) Wellens, M.D., (1935–2020) was a Dutch cardiologist who is considered one of the founding fathers of clinical cardiac electrophysiology - a discipline which enables patients with cardiac arrhythmias to have catheter electrode mapping and ablation.

Wellens was known among European cardiologists as "the giant of Maastricht" and for many years was associated with the University of Limburg School of Medicine in Maastricht, Netherlands. At his department of cardiology, many future clinical cardiac electrophysiologists trained from 1976 until his retirement in 2002.

== Early life and education ==
Wellens was born on 13 November 1935 in The Hague, the Netherlands. He studied medicine at the University of Leiden. Following two years of internal medicine, he did three years of cardiology in the Wilhelmina Gasthuis Hospital of the University of Amsterdam under the guidance of Professor Dirk Durrer.

== Contributions to medicine ==
In the late 1960s, at the University Hospital of Amsterdam, Wellens investigated patients with cardiac arrhythmias by placing cardiac catheters allowing the recording of the electrical activation of the heart at different sites. By connecting these catheters to a pacing device, he showed that it was possible to initiate and terminate cardiac arrhythmias, localize the site of origin of the arrhythmia, and discover the mechanism. By using this approach (called programmed electrical stimulation) Wellens not only unraveled mechanisms and localization of arrhythmias in the Wolff-Parkinson-White syndrome but also other types of supraventricular tachycardias.

In the early 1970s, he showed that programmed electrical stimulation of the heart could also be used to study the mechanism and localization of ventricular tachycardia. In 1971 he published the first book on programmed stimulation of the heart in patients with tachycardias. In 1973 Wellens was appointed Professor of Cardiology at the University of Amsterdam. At that time his new approach allowed the investigation of the effect of drugs on the tachycardia mechanism, the development of new therapeutic strategies such as the termination of tachycardias by specially designed pacemakers, the surgical removal or isolation of the tachycardia substrate, and ultimately cure of cardiac arrhythmias by catheter ablation.

In 1971, he reported on the use of programmed electrical stimulation of the heart in patients with atrial flutter, AV nodal tachycardia, and accessory atrioventricular connections. In 1972, he showed that the arrhythmia of patients with ventricular tachycardia could also reproducibly be initiated and terminated by timed premature stimuli. These investigations were the basis for the new surgical and pacing approaches to the treatment of cardiac arrhythmias that became known as "cardiac electrophysiology".

Wellens left Amsterdam in 1977 to become Professor and Chairman of the Department of Cardiology at the Academic Hospital of the new Maastricht University. There he created his school of arrhythmology, educating many cardiologists from all over the world in the period from 1977 to 2001. After returning to their home country, many became leaders in cardiology.

Wellens was a student Professor Dirk Durrer in Amsterdam and participated in the early development of programmed electrical stimulation of the heart in patients with Wolff–Parkinson–White syndrome. In these patients, cardiac arrhythmias were shown to be initiated and terminated by critically timed premature beats.

Wellens also demonstrated that the reproducible initiation and termination of arrhythmias by programmed electrical stimulation of the heart allowed the study of the effect of antiarrhythmic drugs on the mechanism of the arrhythmia. In 1977, he moved to the new University of Limburg in Maastricht, Netherlands, to develop academic cardiology there. He created an internationally known center for the study and treatment of cardiac arrhythmias.

== Later years ==
In 1990 Wellens became a member of the Royal Netherlands Academy of Arts and Sciences. He directed the Interuniversity Cardiological Institute of the Netherlands (ICIN) from 1993 to 2003, an Institute of the Royal Netherlands Academy of Arts and Sciences, in which the Dutch research activities in cardiovascular research are combined at the national level. He wrote or co-authored over 670 peer-reviewed articles, 254 chapters in books, and was the author or editor of 21 books on cardiology. In collaboration with Mark Josephson from United States, he taught advanced ECG and electrophysiology concepts at international Wellens and Josephson Advanced ECG course.

== Death ==
Wellens died on 9 June 2020 of metastatic gastric cancer. Articles in memoriam of Hein Wellens were published by European Society of Cardiology, authored by past president of European Heart Rhythm Association Karl-Heinz Kuck and by Latin American Heart Rhythm Society, authored by Josep Brugada and Jacob Atié.

== Eponyme ==
Wellens syndrome, an electrocardiographic pattern indicative of critical narrowing in left anterior descending artery of the heart, is named after Hein Wellens who first described this pattern in 1982.
