= EGM =

EGM may refer to:

- Earth Gravitational Model
- An Egg's Guide to Minecraft, a British animated web series.
- Electrogram, an electrical recording of an organ.
- Electronic gaming machine
- Electronic Gaming Monthly, an American video game magazine.
- Empire Gallantry Medal, a British civil award.
- Evidence gap map, in infographics
- Extraordinary general meeting
- Seghe Airport (IATA code), in the Solomon Islands.
- Benamanga language, ISO 639 code egm.
