= Benign early repolarization =

Abnormality in heart function

- Classic and new definitions of early repolarization with end-QRS notching and end-QRS slurring
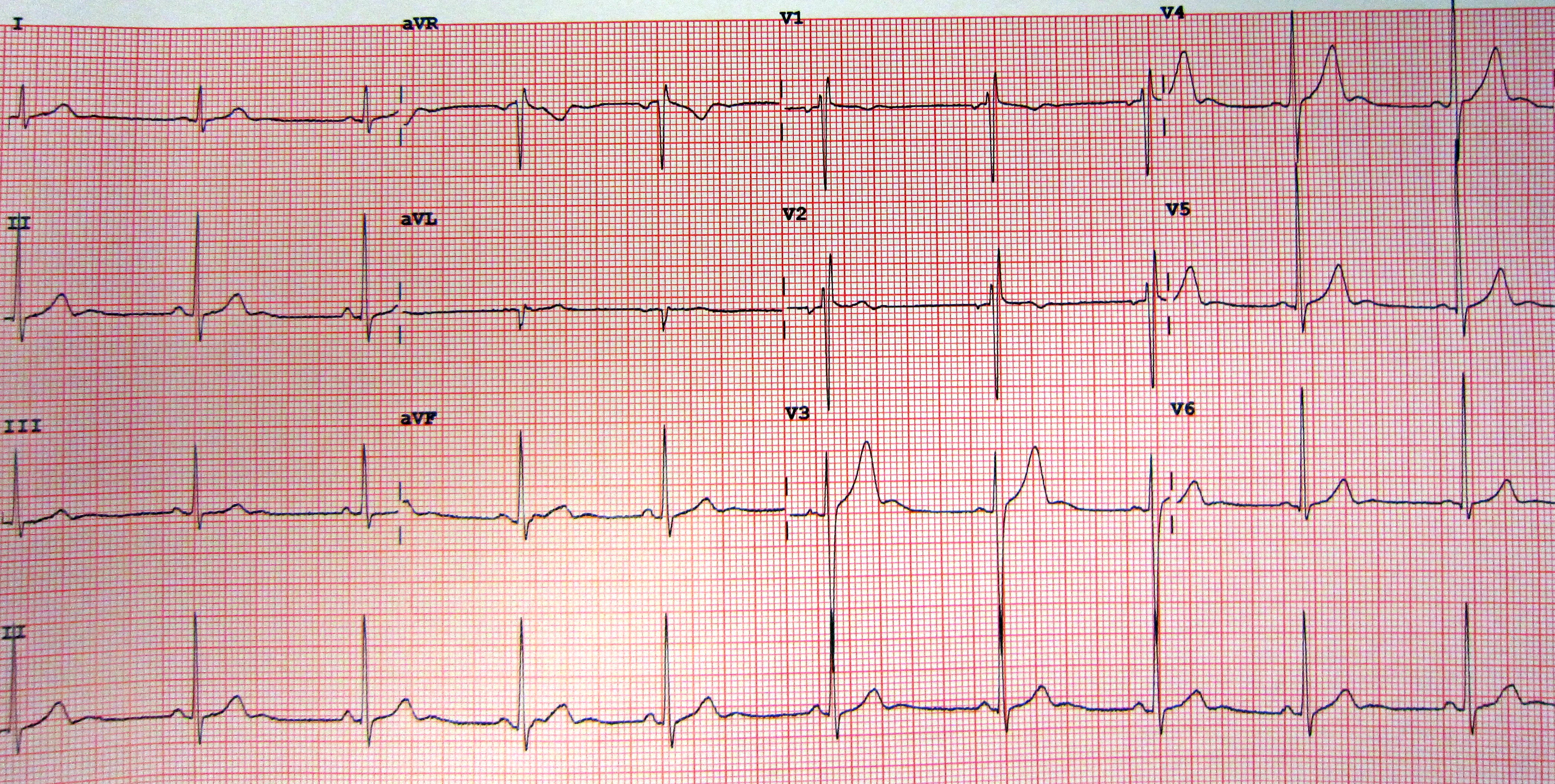
- ECG of a benign early repolarization in a 15-year-old male
- Specialty: Cardiology
- Frequency: 1-13%

In cardiology, benign early repolarization (BER) or early repolarization is found on an electrocardiogram (ECG) in about 1% of those with chest pain. It is diagnosed based on an elevated J-point / ST elevation with an end-QRS notch or end-QRS slur and where the ST segment is concave up. It is believed to be a normal variant.

Benign early repolarization that occurs as some patterns is associated with ventricular fibrillation. The association, revealed by research performed in the late 2000s, is very small.

== Types ==
Benign early repolarization, very prevalent in younger people and healthy male athletes, can be divided into 3 subtypes:

- Type 1 – BER pattern seen in lateral precordial leads.
- Type 2 – BER pattern seen in inferior or inferolateral leads.
- Type 3 – BER pattern seen globally (inferior, lateral, right precordial leads).

== Associations with serious conditions ==
Research in the late 2000s has linked this finding to ventricular fibrillation, particularly in those who have fainted or have a family history of sudden cardiac death. Although there is a significant relationship between ventricular fibrillation and some early repolarization's patterns, the overall lifetime occurrence of idiopathic ventricular fibrillation is exceptionally rare. There has also been an association between early repolarization and short QT syndrome.

=== Risk factors ===
- Male gender
- J-point and horizontal or descending / downsloping ST segment (especially in inferior leads)
- Elevation of ST segment by 2 mm
- Elevation of a J-wave by 0.2 mV or more
- J-point distribution globally
- QRS longer than 110 ms
- Longer duration of J wave, more than 60 ms

== Electrocardiography ==
On an electrocardiogram (EKG or ECG), benign early repolarization may produce an elevation of the J-point and ST segment in 2 or more leads, similar to that observed in heart attacks (myocardial infarction). However, with benign early repolarization, the ST segment is usually concave up, rather than concave down (as with heart attacks), and there is a notable absence of reciprocal changes suggestive of ischemia on the EKG.

== Causes ==
It is thought that the mechanism causing early repolarization is a more excitable ion channel system, which causes a faster myocardium contraction. Studies have shown that higher testosterone levels in males result in an increased outward potassium currents causing J-point elevation.

== Epidemiology ==
Benign early repolarization occurs in about 1 to 13 percent of the general population with a significant increase in occurrence within athletes and adolescents. In one study, an occurrence of early repolarization was observed in 31.6% of elite athletes while in another study occurrence was observed in 25.1% of athletes.

Being a male is strongly associated with early repolarization ECG pattern, and 70% of subjects with early repolarization are males. Prevalence of early repolarization declines in males from early adulthood until middle-age which could suggest a hormonal influence on its presence. Early repolarization patterns are more common in physically active younger individuals, athletes and Africans.

== Genetics ==
Genes associated with ER and ATP sensitive potassium current channel mutations are KCNJ8, ABCC9 Others associated with transient outward potassium current - KCNE5, DPP10, L-type voltage gated calcium current - CACNA1C, CACNB2B, CACNA2D1, sodium current - SCN5A, SCN10A.

== History ==
Early repolarization with ST segment elevation was first described in 1936 by R.A. Shipley and W.R. Hallaran in a study of 200 healthy 20–35 year old people.
