= Notching in electrocardiography =

Changes in electrocardiogram waveforms

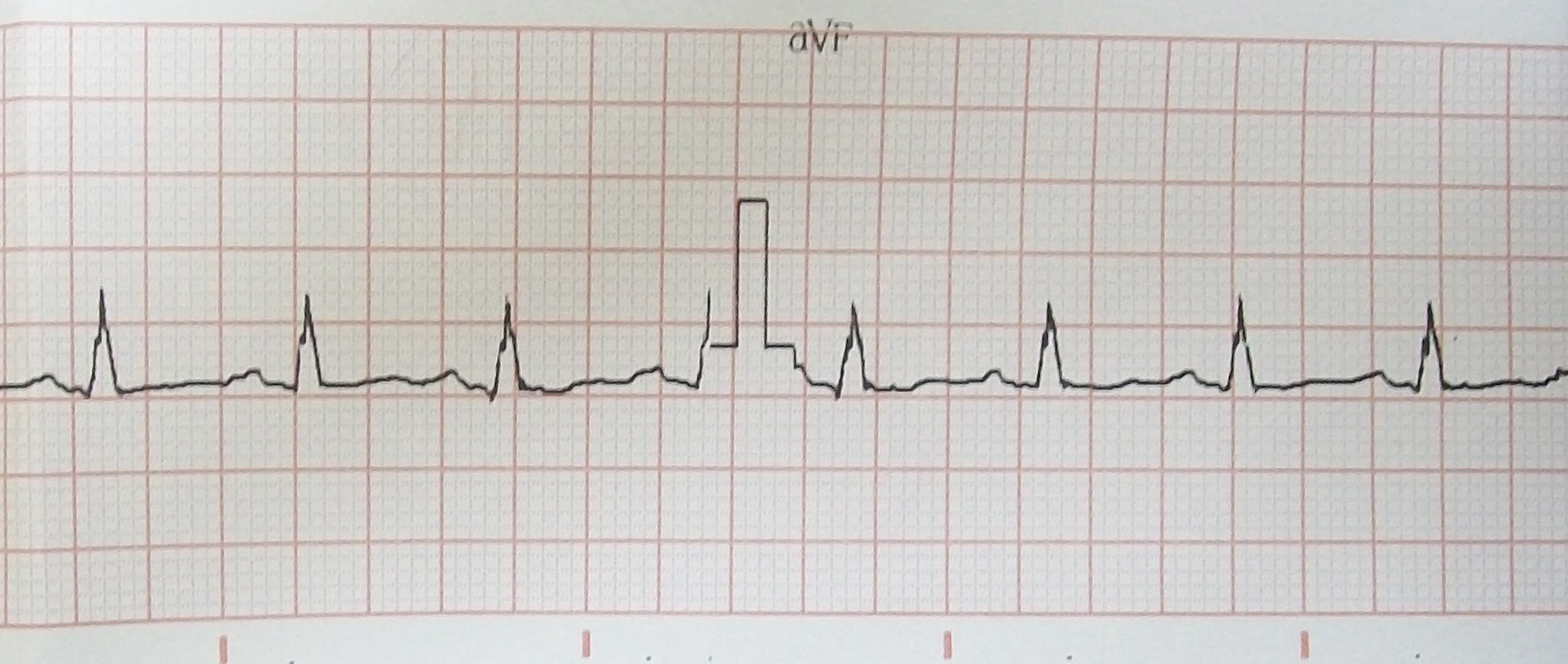
ECG with notching of the ascending branch of the QRS complex in leads aVL and aVF and tachycardia of about 100 beats per minute.

Notching in electrocardiography refers to the presence of distinct deflections or irregularities in the waveform of an electrocardiogram (ECG or EKG), particularly within the P wave, QRS complex (fragmented QRS (fQRS)), or T wave. These notches appear as abrupt changes in the direction or slope of the waveform and can provide critical diagnostic information about cardiac conditions.

Notching in different components of the ECG waveform is associated with various cardiac conditions, ranging from benign variants to serious pathologies, such as conduction delays, atrial fibrillation, myocardial ischemia, or structural heart disease ('crochetage sign' in atrial septal defect (ASD)).

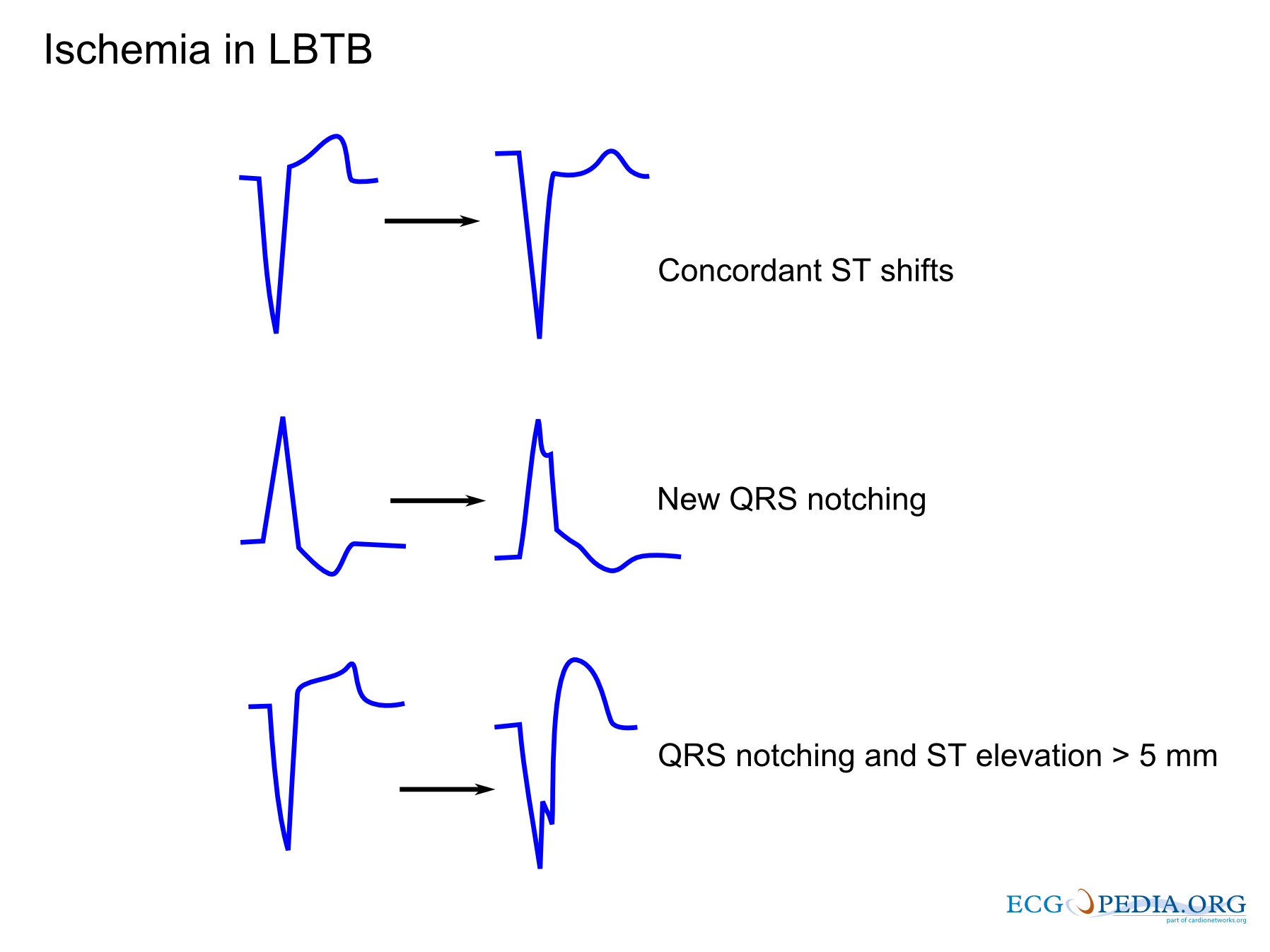
Changes in left bundle branch block (LBBB) during myocardial ischemia

== Definition, characteristics ==
Notching is identified as an abrupt change in the direction of an ECG waveform, resulting in a "notch" or dip that creates a bimodal or M-shaped appearance. It is distinct from slurring, which involves a smooth transition or slowing in the slope of the waveform without a clear change in direction. Notching can occur in the following ECG components:

Ventricular tachycardia (VT) vs Supraventricular tachycardia (SVT) in wide complex tachycardia with LBBB configuration

- P Wave notching: A notched P wave typically appears as a double-peaked or M-shaped wave in lead II, often reflecting delayed atrial conduction or left atrial enlargement. A notched P wave is defined by a peak-to-peak distance of ≥20 ms or ≥40 ms, depending on the diagnostic criteria used.
- QRS complex notching: Notching in the QRS complex is characterized by additional deflections or peaks within the QRS waveform, often in the form of multiple R waves or notches in the R or S waves. It is commonly associated with conduction abnormalities, such as bundle branch blocks, early repolarization. It is also associated with cardiac resynchronization therapy, atrial septal defect, myocardial infarction, or myocardial scarring.
- T wave notching: A notched T wave appears as a biphasic or double-peaked T wave, often linked to conditions like long QT syndrome type 2 (LQTS2) or electrolyte imbalances.

Notching is typically assessed using a standard 12-lead ECG, with modern systems employing digital analysis at high sampling rates (e.g., 500 Hz) to detect subtle notches that may be missed in conventional recordings. High-frequency ECG techniques can enhance the visibility of notching, particularly in the QRS complex.

== Mechanisms ==
Notching in ECG waveforms arises from disruptions in the normal sequence of cardiac depolarization or repolarization. Specific mechanisms include:

- Atrial conduction delay: Notched P waves result from delayed or asynchronous atrial activation, often due to left atrial enlargement or fibrosis, which slows intra-atrial conduction.
- Ventricular conduction abnormalities: QRS notching in bundle branch blocks is caused by delayed conduction through the Purkinje system, leading to asynchronous ventricular depolarization. In LBBB, the left ventricular lateral wall is depolarized last, producing notching in lateral leads.
- Myocardial scarring: Notching in ischemic heart disease reflects local conduction delays due to myocardial scarring or fibrosis, altering the QRS contour. High-frequency ECGs can detect subtle notches obscured in standard recordings.
- Ion channel dysfunction: T-wave notching in LQTS2 is linked to reduced potassium currents (e.g., IKr), which prolong repolarization and create a biphasic T-wave morphology.
- Structural heart disease: Conditions like ASD cause notching (e.g., crochetage sign) due to altered ventricular activation patterns secondary to volume overload.
