= RLD =

RLD may refer to:

- Red-light district
- Relocking device
- Robert Louis-Dreyfus (1946–2009), a Franco-Swiss businessman
- Rashtriya Lok Dal, an Indian political party
- Rossiyskoye Libertarianskoye Dvizhenie (The Russian Libertarian Movement)
- the IATA code of Richland Airport (Washington)
- RELOADED, a warez group
- Right Leg Driving technique, often used in biological signal amplifiers to reduce common-mode interference
