= Ventricular flutter =

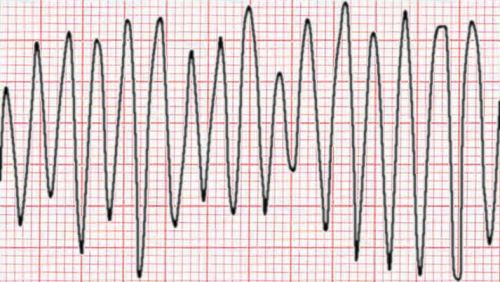
- Specialty: Cardiology
- Symptoms: Chest Pain, Syncope,
- Complications: Ventricular fibrillation, Sudden Cardiac Arrest Death

Ventricular flutter is an arrhythmia, more specifically a ventricular tachycardia affecting the ventricles with a rate over 250-350 beats/min, and one of the most indiscernible. It is characterized on the ECG by a sinusoidal waveform without clear definition of the QRS and T waves. It has been considered as a possible transition stage between ventricular tachycardia and fibrillation, and is a critically unstable arrhythmia that can result in sudden cardiac death.

It can occur in infancy, youth, or as an adult.

It can be induced by programmed electrical stimulation.
