= Hexaxial reference system =

Electrocardiogram result convention

The hexaxial reference system is a diagram that is used to determine the heart's electrical axis in the frontal plane.

The hexaxial reference system is a convention to present the extremity leads of the 12 lead electrocardiogram, that provides an illustrative logical sequence that helps interpretation of the ECG, especially to determine the heart's electrical axis in the frontal plane. The most practical way of using this is by arranging extremity leads according to the Cabrera system, reversing polarity of lead aVR and presenting ECG complexes in the order (aVL, I, -aVR, II, aVF, III). Then determine the direction the maximal ECG vector is "pointing", i.e. in which lead there are most positive amplitude - this direction is the electrical axis - see diagram. Example: If lead I has the highest amplitude (higher than aVL or -aVR), the axis is approximately 0°. Conversely, if lead III has the most negative amplitude it means the vector is pointing away from this lead, i.e. towards -60°.

An alternative use is to locate the most isoelectric (or equiphasic) lead (I, II, III, aVR, aVL, or aVF) on a diagnostic quality ECG with proper lead placement. Then find the corresponding spoke on the hexaxial reference system. The perpendicular spoke will point to the heart's electrical axis. To determine which numerical value should be used, observe the polarity of the perpendicular lead on the ECG.

For example, if the most isoelectric (or equiphasic) lead is aVL, the perpendicular lead on the hexaxial reference system is lead II. If lead II is positively deflected on the ECG, the heart's electrical axis in the frontal plane will be approximately +60°.

- Normal axis: -30° to +90°
- Left axis deviation: -30° to -90°
- Right axis deviation: +90° to +180°
- Extreme axis deviation: -90° to -180°

== Additional images ==
Cabrera circle

Diagram showing how the polarity of the QRS complex in leads I, II, and III can be used to estimate the heart's electrical axis in the frontal plane.

== See also ==
- Electrocardiogram
