= High frequency QRS =

High Frequency QRS
- ECG of a heart in normal sinus rhythm
- Test of: Electrocardiogram

High frequency QRS (HFQRS) refers to the analysis of the high frequency spectral components of the QRS complex in an electrocardiogram (ECG). High frequency analysis of the QRS complex may be useful for detection of coronary artery disease during an exercise stress test. It however requires special software.

== History ==
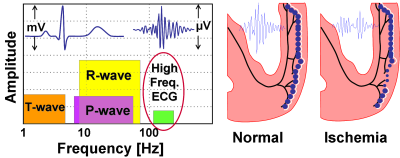
Left: Frequency band of standard ECG components is typically 0.05–100 Hz. HFQRS represents changes in the 150-250 Hz band (marked in red circle). Right: Depicts the physiological basis of HFQRS

HFQRS has been studied since the 1960s. The first studies correlate between incidence of notching and slurring in the QRS complexes to the existence and severity of coronary heart disease. In 1979, a novel signal processing technique, including spatial filtering, averaging and alignment was used to show that HFQRS from patients in coronary care unit are less stable than in healthy subjects. Later, Goldberger et al. identified reduction in the RMS (Root Mean Square) levels of the QRS (within frequency band of 80–300 Hz) in patients with Myocardial Infarction comparing to normal subjects.

Research efforts during the 1980–1990s have shown that myocardial ischemia also induces changes to the depolarization phase and confirmed the use of HFQRS-RMS as a quantitative diagnostic measure of supply myocardial ischemia and demand myocardial (stress-induced) ischemia.
