= Concealed conduction =

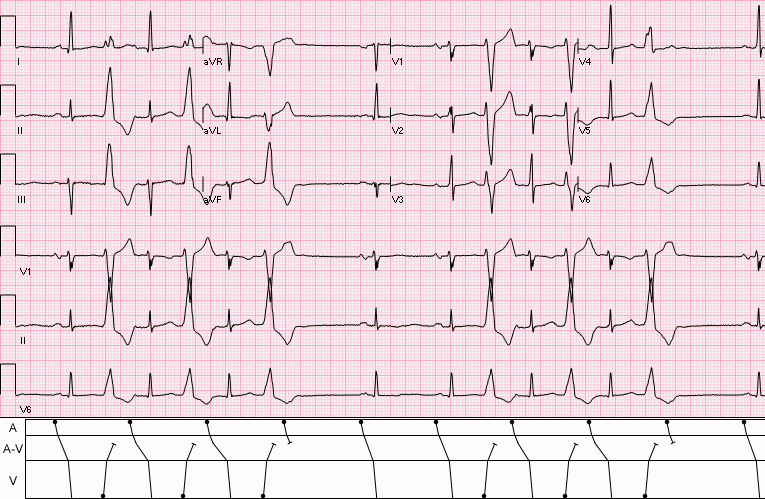
Laddergram illustrating interpolated VPBs and concealed conduction

Concealed conduction is tissue stimulation without direct effect, but leading to a change in conduction characteristics. The term "concealed" is in reference to that the conduction is not observable by electrocardiogram.

A common example would be an interpolated PVC (a type of premature ventricular contraction) during normal sinus rhythm; the PVC does not cause an atrial contraction, because the retrograde impulse from the PVC does not completely penetrate the AV node. However, this AV node stimulation can cause a delay in subsequent AV conduction by modifying the AV node's subsequent conduction characteristics. Hence, the P-R interval after the PVC is longer than the baseline P-R interval.

Concealed conduction can be seen in cardiac aberrancy when a bundle branch temporarily blocks due to being refractory, and conduction from the other bundle branch conceals into the blocked branch retrograde thus perpetuation the bundle branch block morphology in subsequent beats. For example, if a Premature atrial contraction reaches the right bundle branch while refractory the PAC will conduct with RBBB morphology. As this PAC conducts down the left bundle, it will depolarize the septum then proceed retrograde up the right bundle. Eventually, this will reach refractory conduction tissue and stop. The subsequent beat — if early enough — will find the right bundle still refractory and the process will repeat yielding a continued RBBB morphology.

Another variation on this concept is seen in atrial flutter. As a result of the rapid atrial rate, some of the atrial activity fails to get through the AV node in an antegrade direction but can alter the rate at which a subsequent atrial impulse is conducted. In this circumstance, an alteration in the F-wave to QRS relationship is seen.

== See also ==
- Atrioventricular node
- Electrocardiogram
