= Left axis deviation =

Heart condition

The hexaxial reference system is a diagram that is used to determine the heart's electrical axis in the frontal plane.

In electrocardiography, left axis deviation (LAD) is a condition wherein the mean electrical axis of ventricular contraction of the heart lies in a frontal plane direction between −30° and −90°. This is reflected by a QRS complex positive in lead I and negative in leads aVF and II.

There are several potential causes of LAD. Some of the causes include normal variation, thickened left ventricle, conduction defects, inferior wall myocardial infarction, pre-excitation syndrome, ventricular ectopic rhythms, congenital heart disease, high potassium levels, emphysema, mechanical shift, and paced rhythm.

Symptoms and treatment of left axis deviation depend on the underlying cause.

== Defining left axis deviation ==
Cardiac axis in electrocardiography represents the sum of depolarization vectors generated by individual cardiac myocytes. To interpret the cardiac axis, one has to determine the relationship between the QRS axis and limb leads of the ECG. Usually, left ventricles makes up most of the heart muscles, so a normal cardiac axis is directed downward and slightly to the left. In a normal axis, QRS is between -30° and +90°. In contrast to that, left axis deviation (LAD) is defined as QRS axis between −30° and −90°, and right axis deviation is defined as QRS axis greater than +90°, while extreme axis deviation occurs when QRS axis is between -90° and 180°.

== Determining left axis deviation ==
Determining the electrical axis can provide insight into underlying disease states and help steer the differential diagnosis. There are several methods to determining the ECG axis. The easiest method is the quadrant method, where one looks at lead I and lead aVF. First, examine the QRS complex in both leads I and avF and determine if the QRS complex is positive (height of R wave > S wave), equiphasic (R wave = S wave), or negative (R wave < S wave). If lead I is positive and lead aVF is negative, then this is a possible LAD. To determine a true LAD, examine QRS in lead II. If the QRS complex is positive in lead II, then this is a normal axis. On the other hand, if QRS complex is negative in lead II, then this is a LAD. Another method of determining LAD is called the Isoelectric lead, which allows for a more precise estimation of the QRS axis.

== Causes ==
There are several potential causes of LAD. These include normal variation, left ventricular hypertrophy, conduction defects, inferior wall myocardial infarction, preexcitation syndrome, ventricular ectopic rhythms, congenital heart disease, hyperkalemia, emphysema, mechanical shift and pacemaker-generated paced rhythm. Normal variation causing LAD is an age-related physiologic change. Conduction defects such as left bundle branch block or left anterior fascicular block can cause LAD on the ECG. Pre-excitation syndrome as well as congenital heart diseases such as atrial septal defect, endocardial cushion defects can also cause LAD on ECG. Mechanical shifts that cause LAD are expiration or raised diaphragm from pregnancy, ascites (fluid accumulation in the abdomen), abdominal tumor, or enlarged liver or spleen. Left axis deviation is a border deviation in athletes, which, if it is combined with another borderline feature such as right bundle branch block, requires further investigation in view of increased risk of sudden cardiac death.

== Signs and symptoms ==
Left axis deviation symptoms depend on the underlying cause. For example, if left ventricular hypertrophy is the cause of LAD, symptoms can include shortness of breath, fatigue, chest pain (especially with exercise), palpitations, dizziness, or fainting. If a conduction defect such as left bundle branch block is the cause of LAD, there may not be any symptoms unless the conduction defect is caused by heart failure, in which case there can be symptoms of heart failure such as shortness of breath or fatigue.

== Treatment ==
Left axis deviation per se does not require treatment, however the underlying cause can be treated. If left ventricular hypertrophy is the cause of LAD, treatment depends on the underlying cause of the hypertrophy. If high blood pressure is the cause of LVH, then treatment is targeted at lowering blood pressure and preventing further enlargement of the left ventricle by using medications such as angiotensin-converting enzyme inhibitors (ACE inhibitors), angiotensin receptor blockers (ARBs), calcium channel blockers, diuretics, and beta-blockers. If LVH is due to valvular issues such as aortic valve stenosis, surgical repair of the valve or replacement of the valve is required.

== See also ==
- Right axis deviation
