= Evidence gap map =

Tool for identifying areas of research with a lack of evidence

An evidence gap map which cross-references the types of study with types of NPI for COVID-19

An evidence gap map (EGM) is a systematic display of the evidence for a domain which highlights the lack of evidence in particular areas. The evidence gaps typically appear as holes in a matrix of cross-referenced results.
