= Driven right leg circuit =

Electric circuit added to biological signal amplifiers

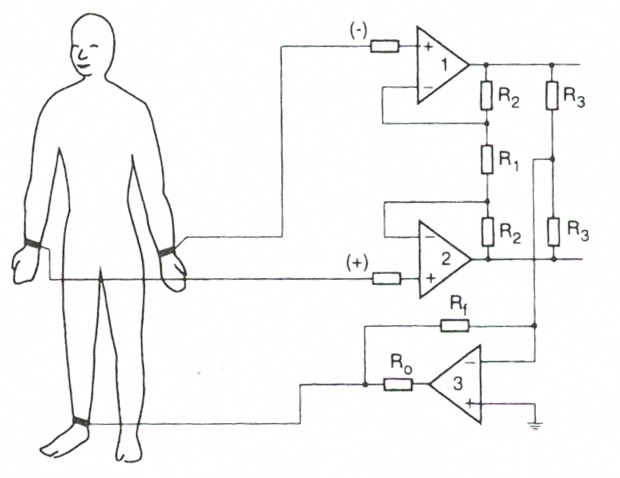
Driven Right Leg Circuit for Electrocardiogram

A driven right leg circuit (DRL circuit; also known as the right leg driving technique) is an electric circuit that is often added to biological signal amplifiers to reduce common-mode interference. Biological signal amplifiers such as ECG (electrocardiogram), EEG (electroencephalogram), or EMG circuits measure very small electrical signals emitted by the body, often as small as several micro-volts (millionths of a volt). However, the patient's body can also act as an antenna which picks up electromagnetic interference, especially 50/60 Hz noise from electrical power lines. This interference can obscure the biological signals, making them very hard to measure. Right leg driver circuitry is used to eliminate interference noise by actively cancelling the interference.

Other methods of noise control include:

- Faraday cage
- Twisting Wires
- High Gain Instrumentation Amplifier
- Filtering
