= Budoff =

Budoff is a surname. Notable people with the surname include:

- Jeffrey Budoff (born 1965), American orthopedic surgeon
- Penny Budoff (1939–2008), American writer

== See also ==
- Carrie Budoff Brown, American journalist and news editor
