= Charles Antzelevitch =

American cardiovascular research scientist

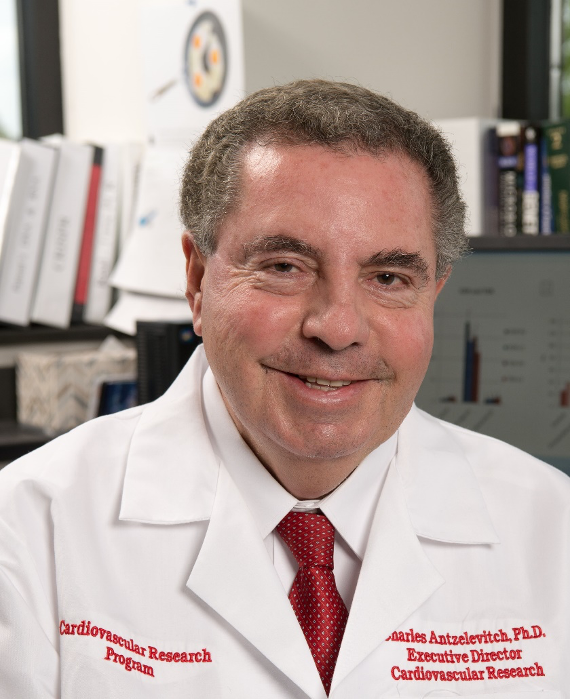
- Education: Queens College (BA); State University of New York Upstate Medical University (PhD)
- Scientific career
- Fields: Cardiology, Electrophysiology, Pharmacology, Genetics
- Workplaces: Lankenau Institute for Medical Research

Charles Antzelevitch is an American cardiovascular research scientist in the fields of cardiac electrophysiology and cardiac arrhythmia syndromes.

== Education ==
Antzelevitch graduated from Queens College, City University of New York with a BA in biology. He earned a PhD in pharmacology from State University of New York Upstate Medical University in 1978. From 1977 to 1980, he held a postdoctoral fellowship in the department of experimental cardiology at the Masonic Medical Research Laboratory (MMRL) in Utica, New York.

== Career ==
After his fellowship, he joined the staff of the MMRL as a research scientist. In 1984, he was named executive director and director of research at the MMRL and was appointed the Gordon K. Moe Scholar, an endowed chair in experimental cardiology, in 1987.

Antzelevitch was a member of the faculty at State University of New York Upstate Medical University in Syracuse, New York, from 1980 until 2015. In 1980, he received an appointment as assistant professor in the department of pharmacology there. In 1983, he was promoted to associate professor and then in 1986, to research professor. He became professor of pharmacology in 1995. In 2015, Antzelevitch moved to the Lankenau Institute for Medical Research (LIMR), where he was appointed professor and executive director of cardiovascular research and director of research at the Lankenau Heart Institute. In 2020, he was designated as distinguished professor emeritus at LIMR.

== Accomplishments ==
Antzelevitch was president of the International Cardiac Electrophysiology Society from 1996 to 1998 and has served as secretary/treasurer since 1998. He serves as associate editor of Heart Rhythm journal as well as on the editorial board of several other peer-reviewed medical publications, including Journal of Electrocardiology and Journal of the American College of Cardiology. He received the Distinguished Scientist Award from the North American Society of Pacing and Electrophysiology (NASPE), currently the Heart Rhythm Society (HRS 2002), Excellence in Cardiovascular Science Award from the NE Affiliate of the American Heart Association (AHA 2003), Carl J. Wiggers Award from the American Physiological Society (2007), Distinguished Scientist Award from the American College of Cardiology (ACC 2011), Distinguished Service Award from the Cardiac Electrophysiology Society (2015), the Douglas P. Zipes Lecture Award from the Heart Rhythm Society (2016) and the Lifetime Achievement Award from the American College of Cardiology (ACC 2020).

== Selected publications ==
- Antzelevitch C, Yan G-X Ackerman MJ, Borggrefe M, Corrado D; Guo J; Gussak I; Hasdemir C; Horie M; Huikuri H; Ma C; Morita H; Nam G-B; Sacher F; Shimizu W; Viskin S; Wilde AAM. J-Wave syndromes expert consensus conference report: Emerging concepts and gaps in knowledge: Endorsed by the Asia Pacific Heart Rhythm Society (APHRS), the European Heart Rhythm Association (EHRA), the Heart Rhythm Society (HRS), and the Latin American Society of Cardiac Pacing and Electrophysiology (Sociedad Latinoamericana de Estimulacifin Cardiaca y Electrofisiologia [SOLAECE]). Published in 3 journals worldwide: Heart Rhythm. 2016 Oct;13(10):e295-324. PMID 27423412; Europace. 2017 Apr 1;19(4):665-6942016. PMID 27411360; Journal of Arrhythmia 2016; J Arrhythm. 2016 Oct;32(5):315-339. PMID 27761155.
- Antzelevitch C. Brugada Syndrome. In: Encyclopedia of Cardiovascular Research and Medicine. Cardiac Electrophysiology, Arrhythmias and Sudden Death Section, Vasan Ramachandran and Douglas Sawyer, Editors-in-Chief and In: Elsevier Biomedical Sciences Reference Modules, 2017.
- Chen PS, Antzelevitch C. Mechanisms of cardiac arrhythmias and conduction disturbances. In: Hurst's The Heart 14th ed. Fuster V, O'Rourke R, Walsh R, Poole-Wilson P, eds. McGraw Hill, New York, NY, Chapter 79, 2017.
- Antzelevitch C, Di Diego JM. Tpeak-Tend Interval as a Marker of Arrhythmic Risk. Invited Editorial. Heart Rhythm, S1547-5271(19)30017-7, 2019.
- Jérôme Clatot*, Nathalie Neyroud, Robert Cox, Charlotte Souil, Pascale Guicheney, and Charles Antzelevitch. Inter-regulation of Kv4.3 and Voltage-gated Sodium Channels Underlies Predisposition to Cardiac and Neuronal Channelopathies. Int J Mol Sci. 2020 Jul 17;21(14): E5057. PMID 32709127.
- Peter J. Schwartz, Michael J. Ackerman, Charles Antzelevitch, Connie R. Bezzina, Martin Borggrefe, Bettina F. Cuneo, Arthur A. M. Wilde. Inherited Cardiac Arrhythmias. Nature Reviews Disease Primers, Jul 16;6(1):58, 2020. PMID 32678103.
- Chen P-S, Antzelevitch C, Ho SY, Priori S. Electrophysiologic anatomy, mechanisms of arrhythmias and conduction disturbances, and genetics, 15th Edition of Hurst's The Heart, 2020.
- Di Diego JM*, Patocskai B*, Barajas-Martinez H*, Borbáth V; Ackerman MJ, Burashnikov A, Clatot J, Li G-R, Robinson VM, Hu D and Antzelevitch C. Acacetin Suppresses the Electrocardiographic and Arrhythmic Manifestations of the J Wave Syndromes. PLoS One. 2020 Nov 24;15(11):e0242747 .PMID 33232375.
