= State University of New York Upstate Medical University =

Public medical school in Syracuse, New York, US

- Other names: Updated Medical University, SUNY Upstate
- Former names: Geneva Medical College (1834–1871); Syracuse University College of Medicine (1871–1950); State University of New York Upstate Medical Center (1950–1986); State University of New York Health Science Center at Syracuse (1986–1999)
- Type: Public medical school
- Established: 1834; 192 years ago
- Parent institution: State University of New York
- Endowment: $158.1 million (2025)
- Chancellor: John King Jr.
- President: Mantosh Dewan, M.D.
- Students: 1,442 (fall 2025)
- Undergraduates: 205 (fall 2025)
- Postgraduates: 1,237 (fall 2025)
- Location: Syracuse, New York, United States; 43°02′34″N 76°08′24″W
- Campus: Urban, 99 acres (0.40 km^{2})
- Colors: Navy Blue & Steel Blue
- Website: upstate.edu
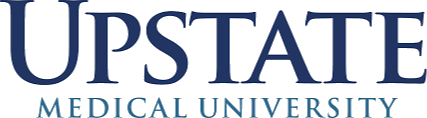

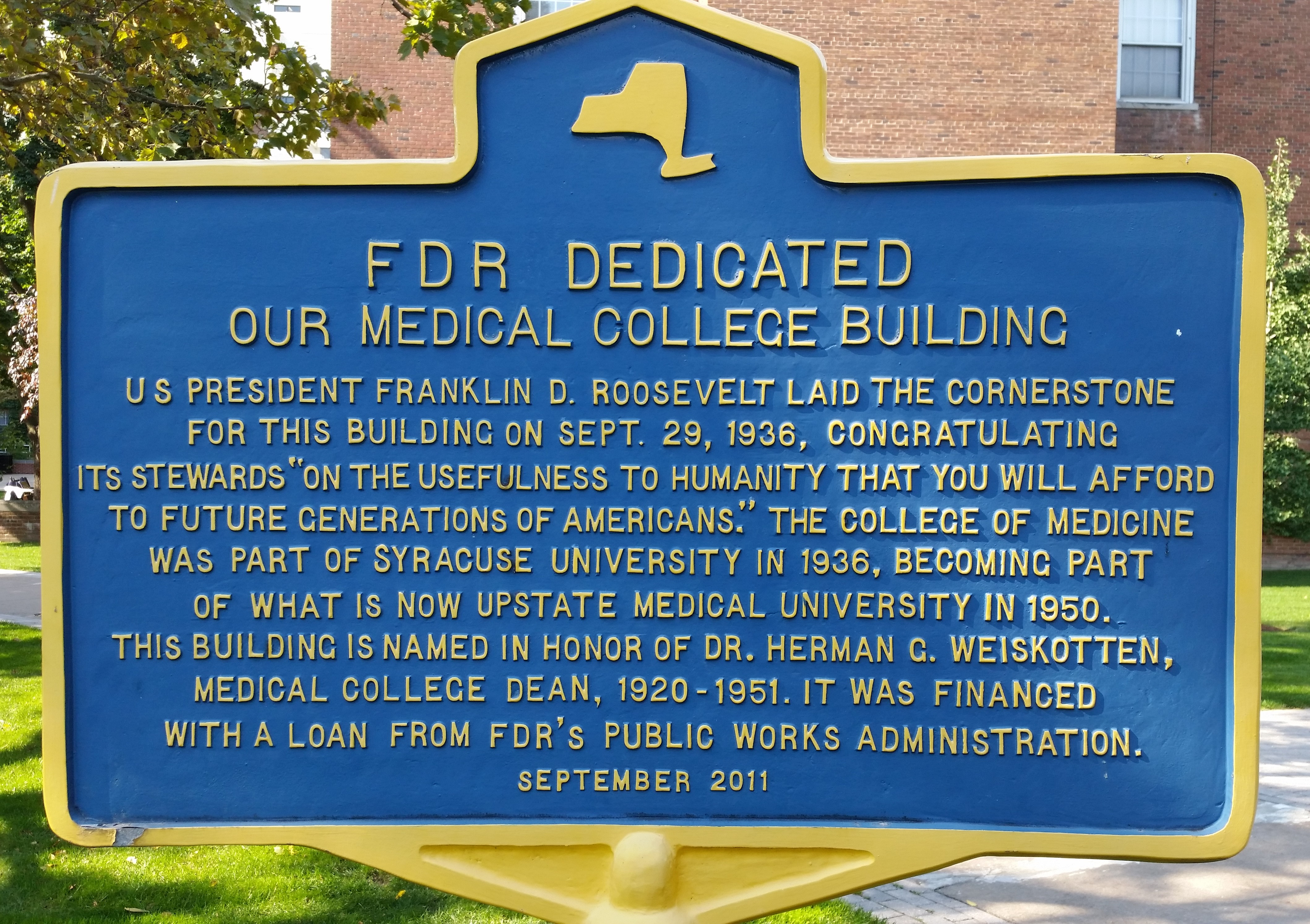
New York State historic marker at Upstate Medical University.

The State University of New York Upstate Medical University (SUNY Upstate and Upstate Medical University) is a public medical school in Syracuse, New York. Founded in 1834, Upstate is the 15th-oldest medical school in the United States and the only medical school in Central New York. The university is part of the State University of New York (SUNY) system.

SUNY Upstate is an upper-division transfer and doctoral university with degree-granting programs in the Norton College of Medicine (NCOM), College of Health Professions (CHP), College of Graduate Studies (CoGS), and the College of Nursing.

As one of 140 academic medical centers in the United States, the Upstate University Health System serves over 1.8 million people annually. Its facilities include Upstate University Hospital, the region's only Level 1 trauma and burn center; Upstate Community Hospital; Golisano Children's Hospital; Upstate Brain & Spine Center; Upstate Cardiovascular Center; Upstate Cancer Center; and other satellite sites in Central New York. Many of Upstate's faculty provide patient care, teach, and conduct research at the University Hospital.

Part of the SUNY system since 1950, Upstate provides over 12,000 employment opportunities, making it Central New York's largest employer. The university adds more than $2.5 billion to the state economy annually. Over 8,000 SUNY Upstate alumni physicians are licensed in the United States, and they generate more than $24.8 billion in economic activity and support or employ over 140,000 employees.

== History ==
=== Geneva Medical College (1834–1871) ===
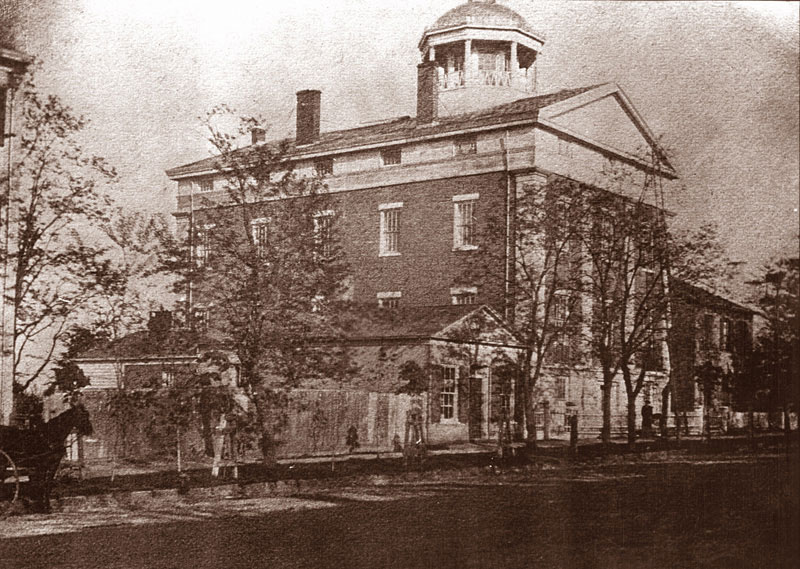
Geneva Medical College

The present Upstate Medical University College of Medicine traces its ancestry to Geneva Medical College, founded on September 15, 1834, as part of Geneva College, today known as Hobart and William Smith Colleges. The medical school, located in Geneva, New York, was the brainchild of Edward Cutbush, MD, who became its first dean. GMC held its first classes in February 1835 and became the first college to grant a full M.D. to a woman, Elizabeth Blackwell, in 1849.

Among the early luminaries at GMC were Prof. of Surgery Frank Hastings Hamilton, pioneer in orthopedics, military surgery, and military hygiene; Stephen Smith, briefly a GMC student in 1847–1848, later an innovative sanitarian and surgeon in New York City; Lecturer in the Theory and Practice of Medicine Austin Flint, developer of modern methods of auscultation, cofounder (with Hamilton and several other GMC faculty) of the University of Buffalo College of Medicine, and eventually President of the American Medical Association (AMA); and Prof. of Anatomy and Physiology Willard Parker, who became the premier surgeon at Bellevue.

=== Syracuse University College of Medicine (1871–1950) ===
In 1871, Hobart disbanded GMC and sold its library, anatomical specimens, and other tangible assets to Dean John Towler. Acting as a private citizen, Towler donated these materials to the new Syracuse University on condition that the trustees immediately establish an AMA-approved medical school. Thus, the Syracuse University College of Medicine came into being on December 4, 1871, with Frederick Hyde as dean.

In 1876, Sarah Loguen Fraser became the first woman to gain an MD from the college, now known as the SUNY Upstate Medical University, and is believed to be the fourth African-American woman to become a licensed physician in the United States. A portrait of Dr Sarah Loguen Fraser hangs in the Upstate Medical University's library. Other commemorations of Dr Loguen Fraser include a campus street and building named in her honor, as well as a scholarship from the Norton College of Medicine. In 2025, a statue of Sarah Loguen Fraser was erected on the Upstate campus.

In the latter part of the century, the SU College of Medicine was among the first to institute a graded medical instruction program, with definite pre-clinical and clinical years and organize its curriculum according to the so-called "German model," with intense scientific and especially laboratory training for students in the first two years, and rigorous clinical training on rounds thereafter. This tradition of steadily improving educational methods, practices, and facilities placed the SU College of Medicine in a good light for the Carnegie Foundation's Flexner Report in 1910. The Flexner Report hastened the demise of many medical schools in the United States and Canada, but, as Abraham Flexner wrote, "Of the eleven medical schools now existing in the state, only the bona-fide university departments can then expect to survive: outside of New York City, Syracuse University alone has just now a chance."

=== Acquisition by the State University of New York (1950–present) ===
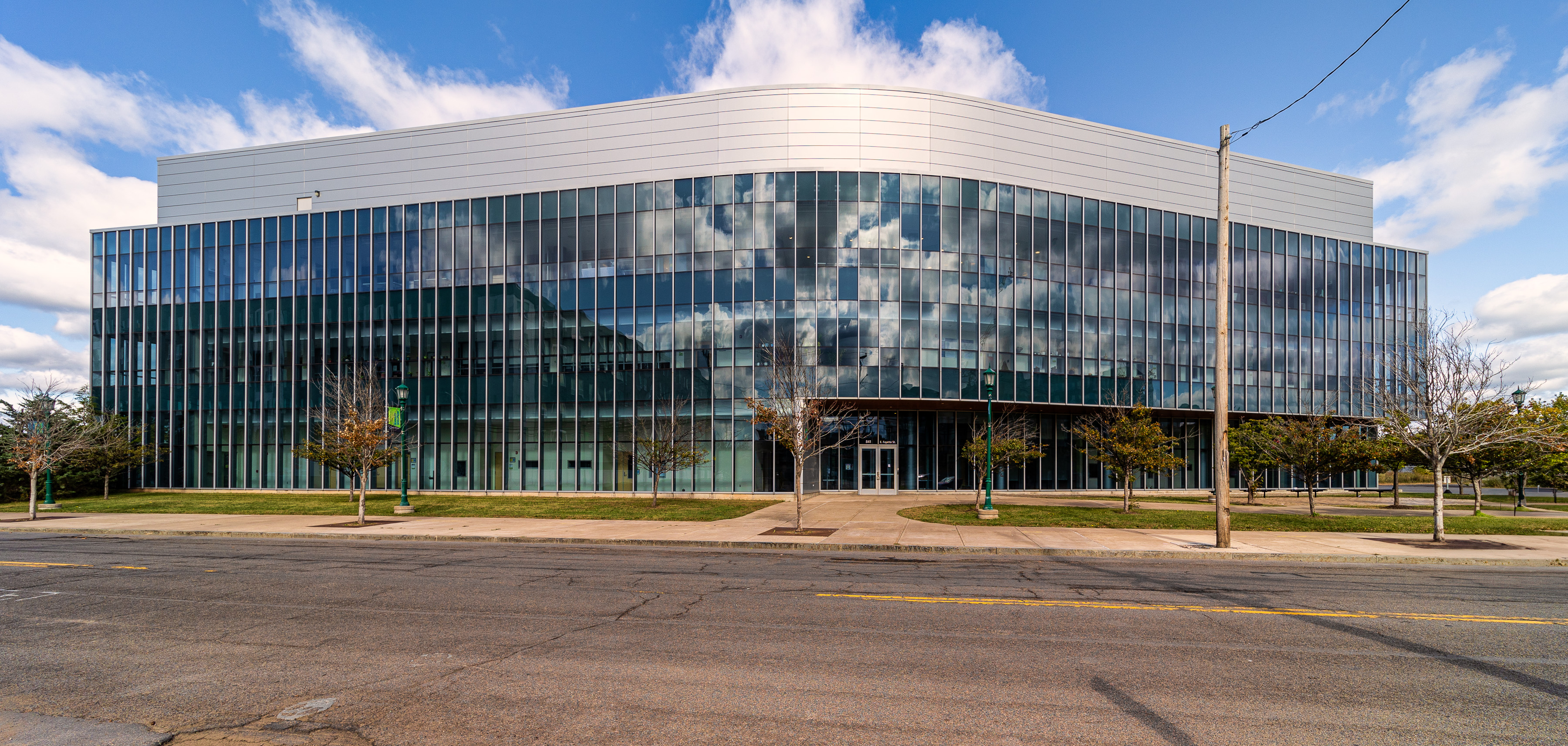
Central New York Biotech Accelerator in Syracuse

In 1950, State University of New York (SUNY) moved to add a medical center in Syracuse and ultimately acquired the College of Medicine from Syracuse University as a part of Governor Thomas E. Dewey's vision for Upstate New York. After carrying the names "SUNY Upstate Medical Center" (initially) and "SUNY Health Science Center at Syracuse" (1986), the institution was renamed to become SUNY Upstate Medical University in 1999.

The first decade of the 21st century has been one of growth: the opening of the Institute for Human Performance for basic and clinical research; the East Tower expansion of University Hospital that houses the Golisano Children's Hospital and other clinical specialties; the Upstate cancer center; the Nappi Longevity Institute; a renovated gross anatomy lab; the Setnor Academic Building with a unique clinical skills center; and the purchase of land for a new Biotechnology Research Center; Geneva Tower including expansion of facilities past Interstate 81.

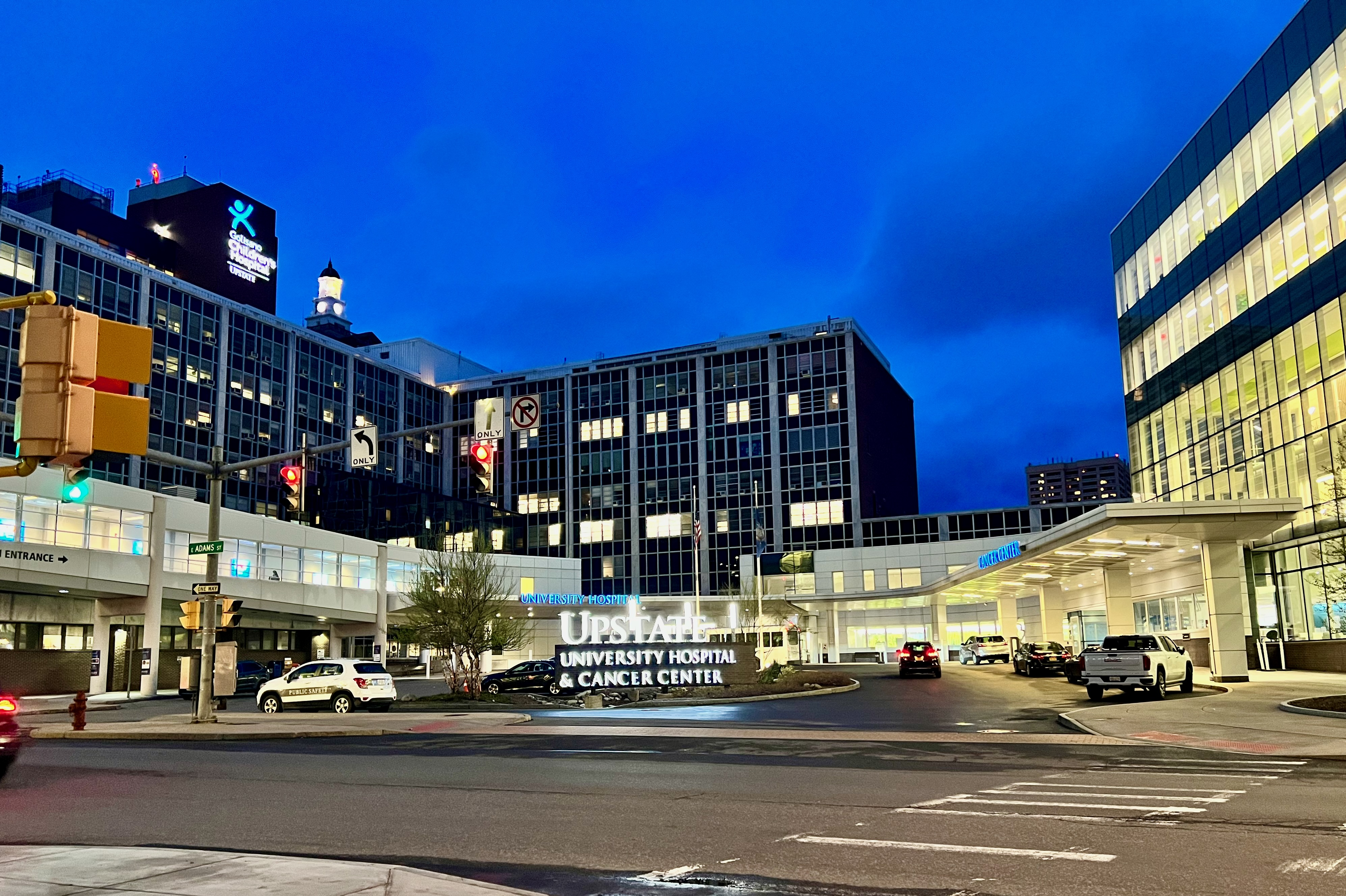
Upstate University Hospital, teaching hospital arm of Upstate Medical University

== Campus ==
The university's main campus is located in the University Hill neighborhood of Syracuse, New York flanking Interstate 81. It includes Upstate University Hospital, the Institute for Human Performance, Setnor Academic Building, Central New York Gamma Knife Center, Jacobsen Hall, Regional Oncology Center, Upstate Golisano Children's Hospital, Weiskotten Hall, the Health Sciences Library, Silverman Hall, and Geneva Tower residence hall. A clinical campus in Binghamton, New York was established in 1976. Medical students spend their first two years of medical school in Syracuse, New York and then approximately a quarter of the class completes their training in Binghamton. Although the Clinical Campus is community-based, Binghamton students spend similar amounts of time in hospitals on their rotations.

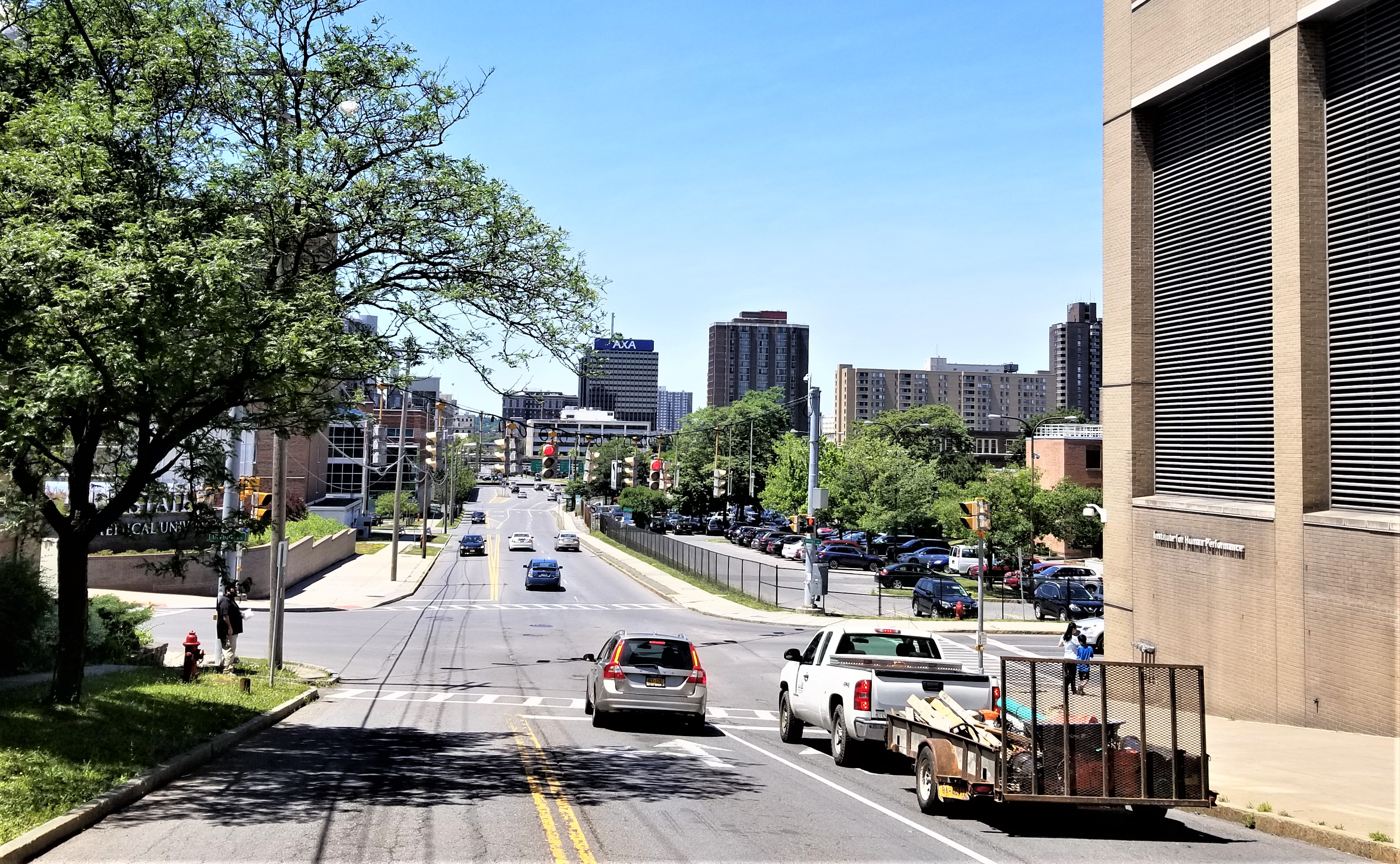
Upstate medical is located at the heart of downtown Syracuse, University Hill with neighboring Syracuse University and SUNY ESF.

Medical students on the Syracuse campus complete their clinical years at Upstate's own University Hospital and its affiliates. Students on the Syracuse campus learn alongside doctors at the Central New York Gamma Knife Center, Upstate's Clark Burn Center, the Joslin Diabetes Center etc. In 2025, two statues honoring the universities celebrated alumni, Elizabeth Blackwell, the first woman to receive a medical degree in the United States, and Sarah Loguen Fraser, one of the first African American women to earn a medical degree, were unveiled in the college courtyard.

== Upstate University Health System ==
Upstate University Hospital is a 752-bed non-profit, teaching hospital located in Syracuse, New York. Upstate University Hospital is a part of the Upstate Health System, as the flagship hospital in the system. As the hospital is a teaching hospital, it is affiliated with the Upstate Medical University. The hospital is also an American College of Surgeons verified Level 1 Trauma Center, the only in the region and one of 21 in New York. Attached to the hospital is the Upstate Golisano Children's Hospital that treats infants, children, teens, and young adults aged 0–21.

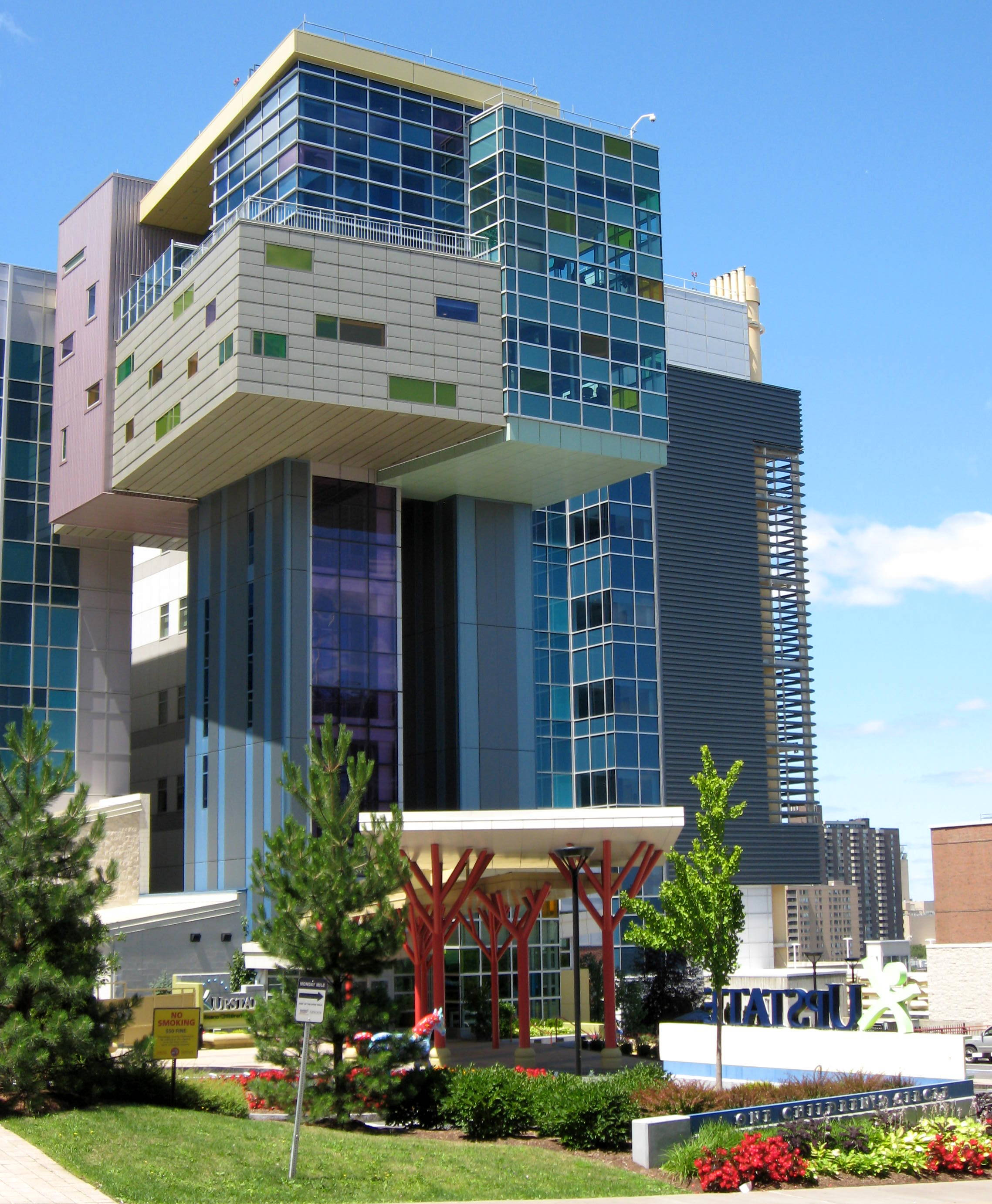
Upstate Golisano Children's Hospital

In addition to being the region's only Level-I Trauma Center, Upstate includes:

- Upstate Golisano Children's Hospital
- Upstate University Hospital Community Campus
- Upstate Cancer Center
- Upstate Brain & Spine Center
- Numann Center for Breast, Endocrine & Plastic Surgery
- Nappi Wellness Institute
- Golisano Center for Special Needs, including the Biobehavioral Health Inpatient Unit.

University Hospital's New York State Designated Centers include:

- Upstate Level I Adult Trauma Center
- Upstate Level I Pediatric Trauma Center, 1 of only 4 in New York
- Upstate Comprehensive Stroke Center
- Clark Burn Center
- Upstate Designated AIDS Center

There are seven clinical departments that offer surgery at Upstate University Hospital. Collectively, the hospital offers more surgeons, robotic instrumentation, and specialty procedures than any other facility in Central New York, with the Department of Surgery providing the largest component. In addition, the past decade has seen the expansion of cancer surgical specialties at Upstate. The surgeons who treat cancer see patients through the Upstate Cancer Center, a newer facility that provides disease-specific, multidisciplinary care to patients with different types of cancer.

== Academics ==
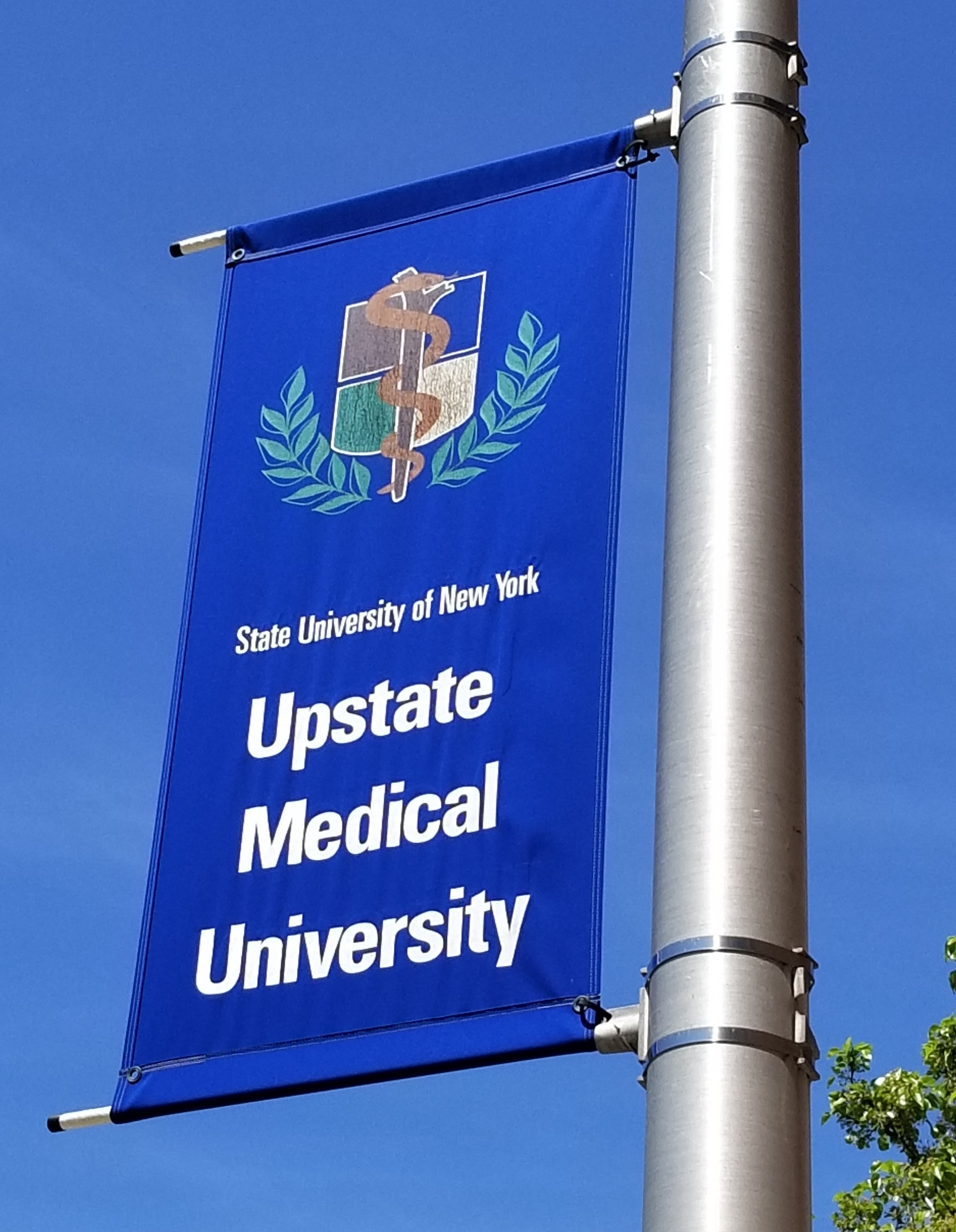
Upstate Medical University Banner

Upstate is an upper-division transfer and doctoral university classified among "Special Focus Four-Year: Medical Schools and Centers", 1 of only 54 in the nation specializing solely in health care careers. This means students applying to the bachelors programs take the prerequisite courses (minimum 60 semester hours) at another college and then complete their junior and senior years of the bachelor's degree at Upstate for their program of study. Students in the graduate and post-graduate programs enter having completed a bachelor's and/or a master's degree before enrollment.

Total enrollment is 1,592 students (including 699 medical students) in addition to 619 residents and clinical fellows. Upstate employs 623 full-time faculty members and 1,809 part-time and voluntary faculty.

=== Norton College of Medicine ===
The Norton College of Medicine is the 2nd and 15th oldest medical school in New York state and the United States, respectively. The COM offers professional and graduate degrees, including the Master of Public Health (MPH) and Doctor of Medicine (MD). In addition, in conjunction with the College of Graduate Studies, the COM grants joint degrees including MD/MBA, MD/PhD and MD/MPH.

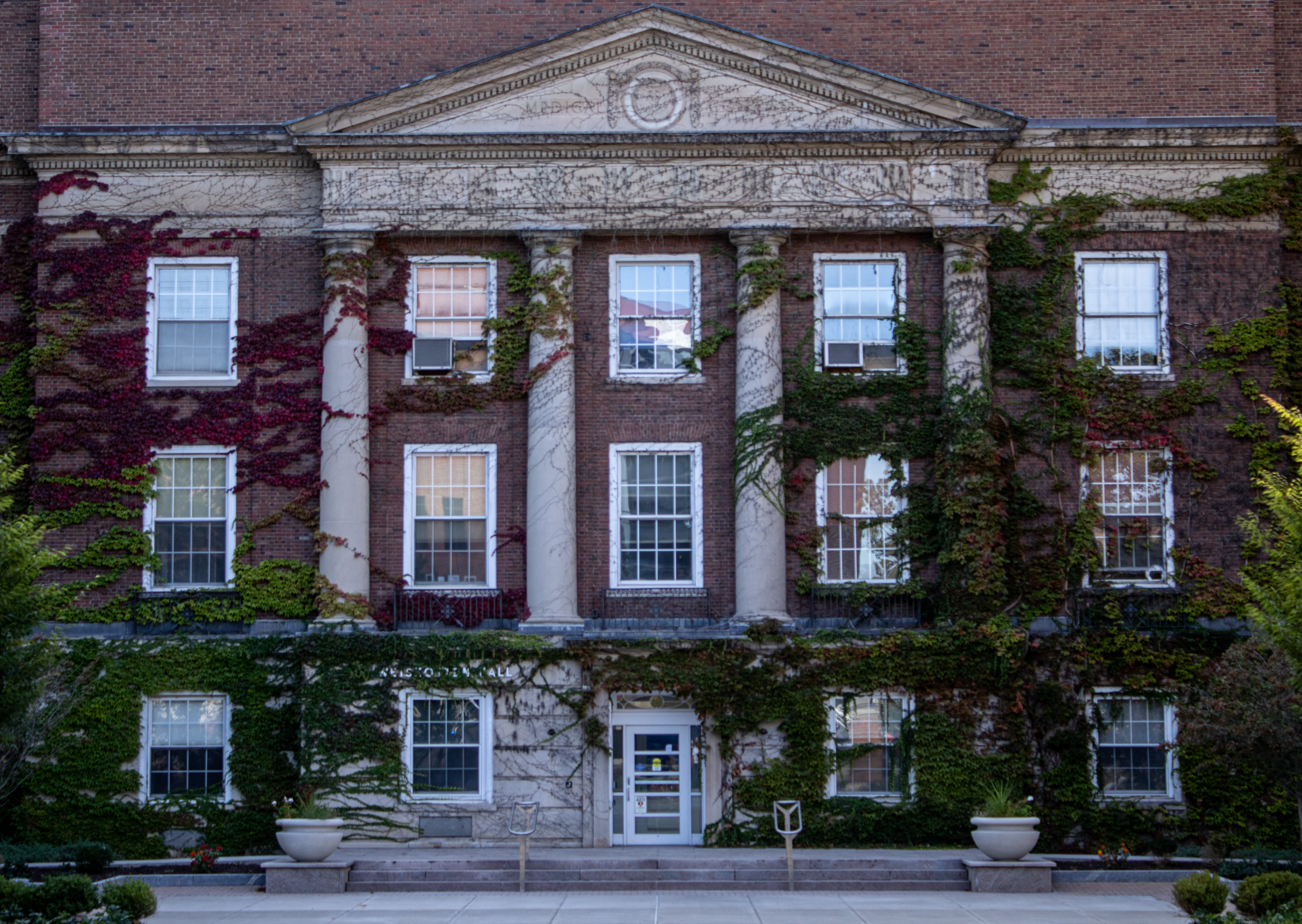
Main medical campus building, Weiskotten Hall

The College of Medicine is the highest-funded school within the university; as a result, graduates continue to do exceptionally well in matching into high-quality programs for residency and match at a higher rate than the national average. Students in the College of Medicine have access to research facilities, classrooms, laboratories and clinical facilities, including the Clinical Skills Teaching Center, Surgical Simulation, Research and Training Center, Gross Anatomy lab and Research Labs at the Institute of Human Performance (IHP).

All College of Medicine students spend their first two years at the Upstate Medical University campus in Syracuse. At the start of the third year, one-fourth of the class moves to the Binghamton Clinical Campus, one hour south of Syracuse, for their third year, and most elect to stay for their fourth. The rest of the class remains in Syracuse.

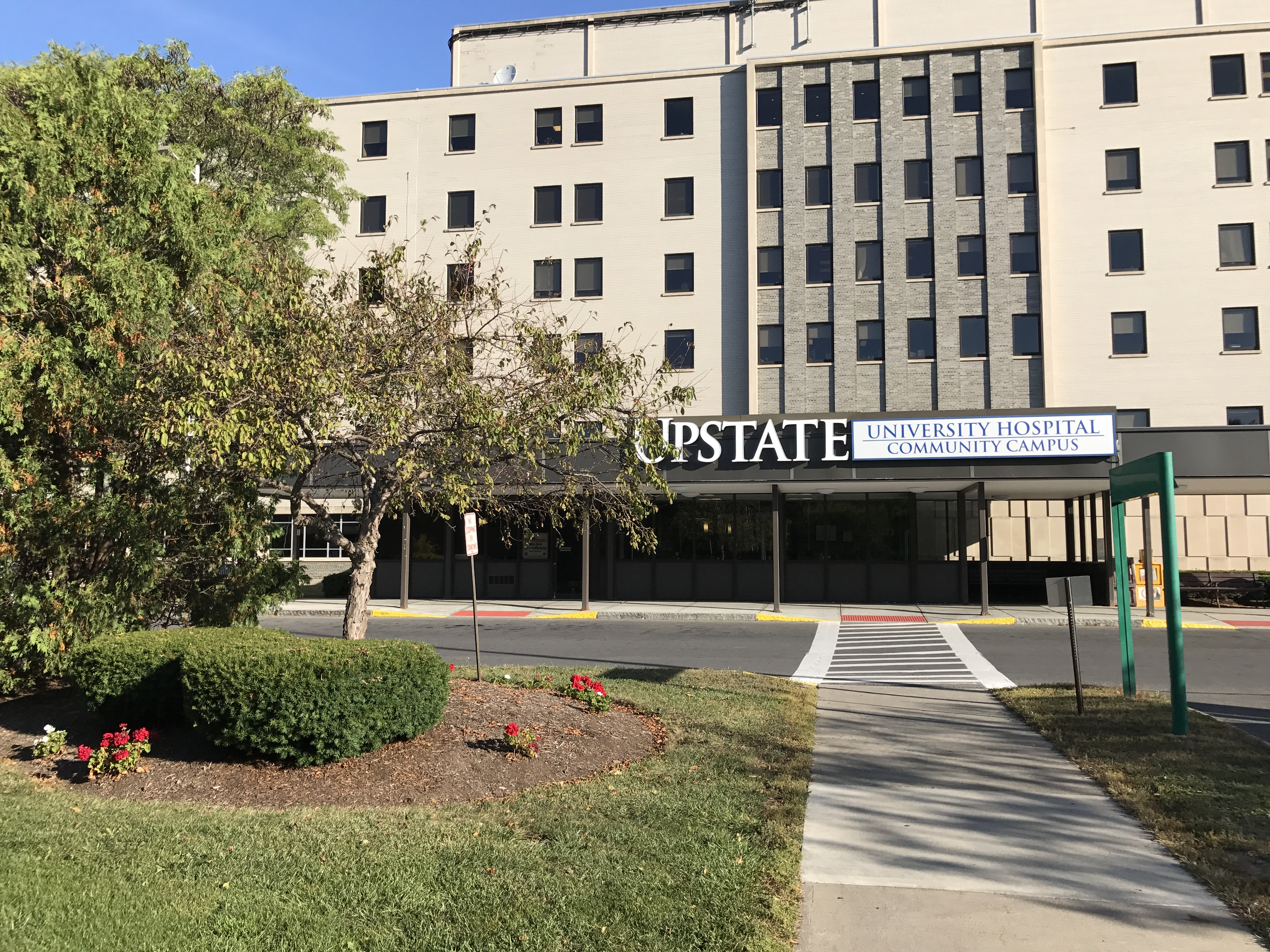
Upstate University Hospital, Community Campus

As an academic medical center, most of the physicians providing services at Upstate University Hospital are also faculty at Upstate's College of Medicine, demonstrating an ongoing commitment to education and training. Several departments — Internal Medicine, Ophthalmology, Urology, Orthopedics, and Neurosurgery, in particular — have considerable faculty and external funding dedicated to their research mission. Physicians also partner with external institutions, such as nearby Syracuse and Cornell Universities for tissue engineering and brain tumor research.

Along with the University Hospital, the College of Medicine has five clinical affiliates in Syracuse and over 400 clinical sites throughout Central New York, including:

- Syracuse Veteran Affairs Medical Center, over 650 students, residents, interns, and fellows receive training at the Medical Center each year
- Crouse Hospital, in operation since 1887, serves more than 22,000 discharges, over 82,000 emergency services visits, and more than 365,000 outpatient visits each year
- Upstate Community Hospital has a medical staff of 460 physicians who provide outpatient and surgical services to more than 12,000 patients each year

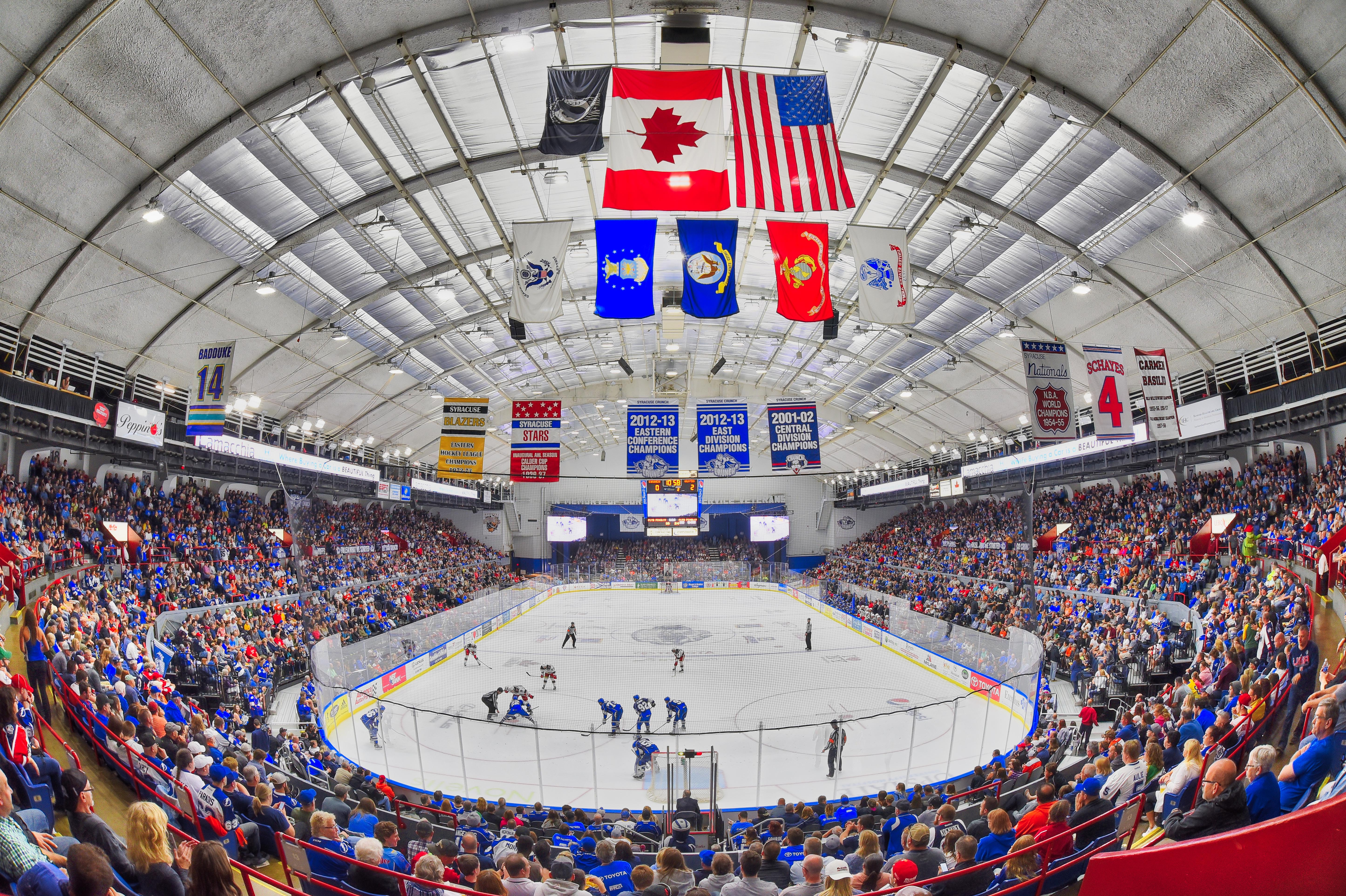
Upstate Medical University Arena, home of the Syracuse Crunch

In addition, there are more than 20 clinical departments at the college fully accredited by the Accreditation Council for Graduate Medical Education (ACGME), training more than 700 resident physicians.

On December 22, 2021, the College of Medicine was renamed the Alan and Marlene Norton College of Medicine in recognition of a $25 million estate gift made by Alan and Marlene Norton. Alan Norton graduated from the College of Medicine in 1966 and then went on to complete his residency and fellowship training at the Wilmer Eye Institute of Johns Hopkins University and Massachusetts Eye and Ear.

On April 20, 2022, SUNY Upstate Medical University and Syracuse University reached a partnership to start a joint M.D./MBA program that will allow students the opportunity to earn two degrees within a five-year program.

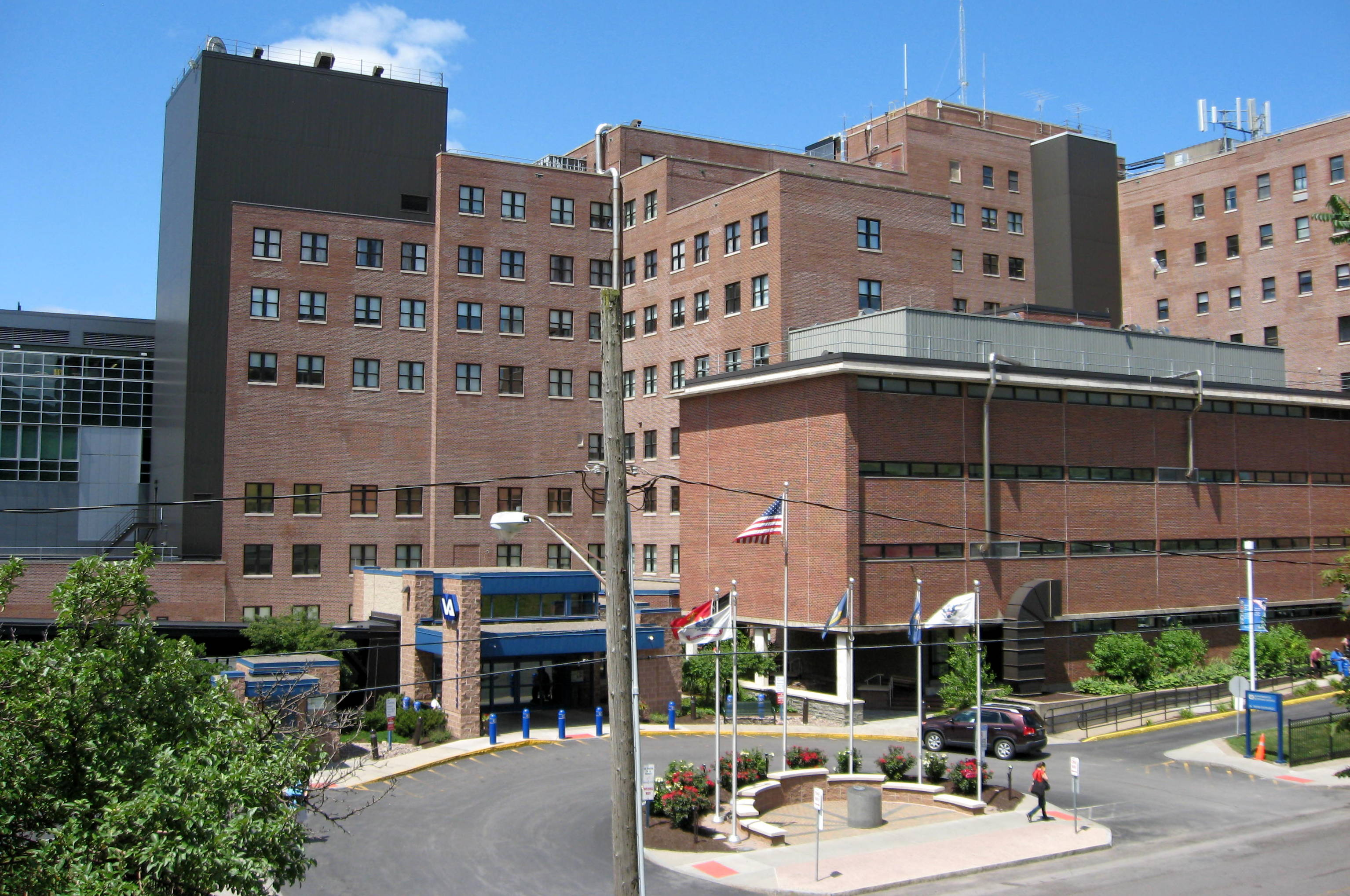
Syracuse Veterans Affairs Medical Center, students and residents get their training in part with an affiliation with Upstate.

=== College of Graduate Studies ===
The College of Graduate Studies awards the Doctor of Philosophy (Ph.D.) and Master of Science (M.S.) in a variety of Biomedical Research Departments and is known for its basic science education and research. The graduate studies program began in 1947 when the college first offered master's and PhD degrees in biochemistry. The college now has graduate programs for Biochemistry & Molecular Biology, Cell & Developmental Biology, Microbiology & Immunology, Neuroscience, Pharmacology and Physiology. In addition, the college, along with the College of Medicine,e offers a joint MD/PhD.

=== College of Nursing ===
To meet the shortage of nurses, the State University of New York Upstate Medical University initiated an Associate degree program in 1959. More than 500 registered nurses graduated from the program between 1959 and 1976. In 1974, as a response to the need for primary care nurses, a Nurse Practitioner Certificate Program was implemented. This program was supported primarily by federal grant monies.

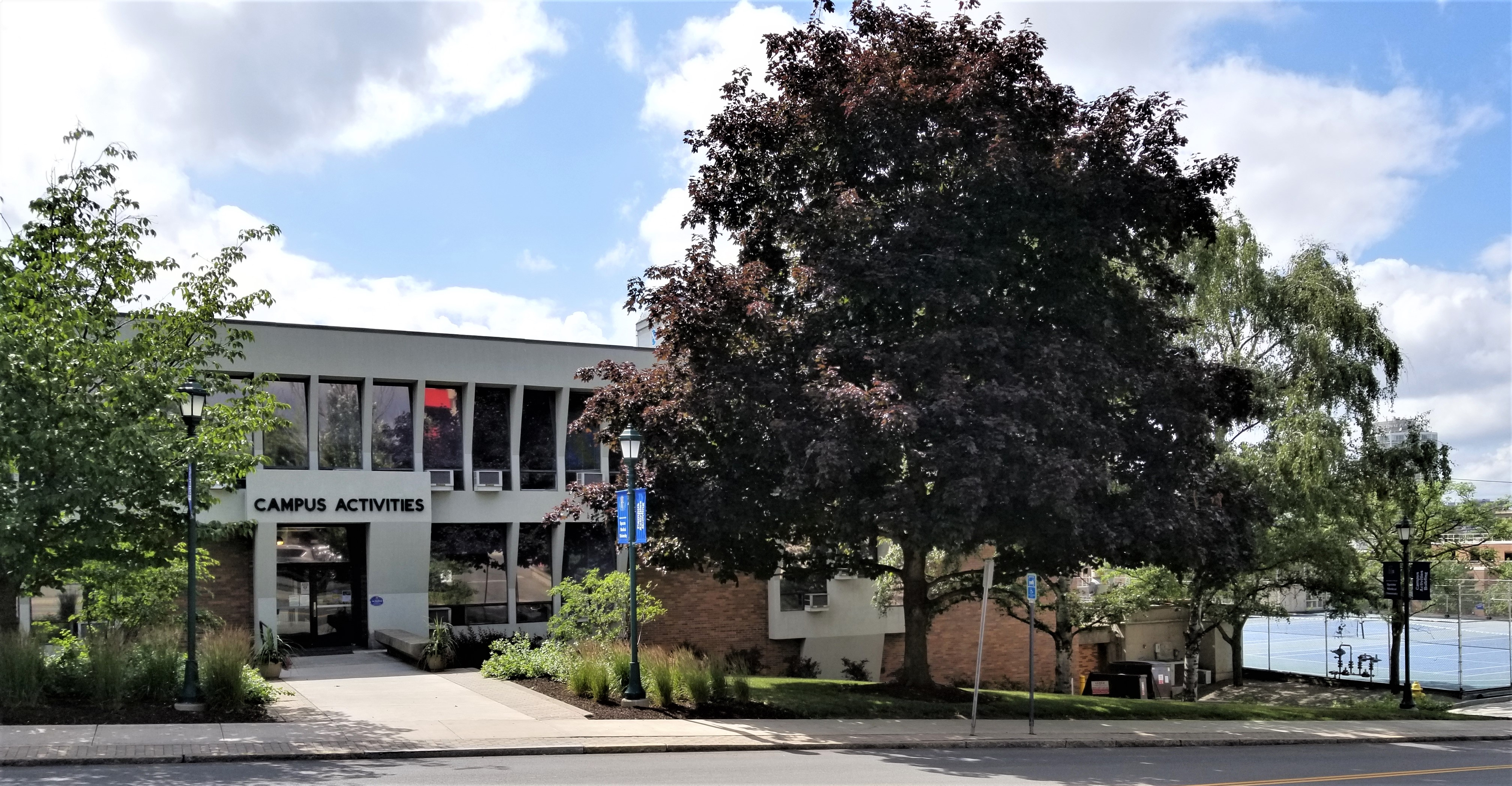
Student Activities Center

As enrollment grew, the College of Nursing was initially established in 1986, with M. Janice Nelson appointed as the first dean. Soon after, it began offering bachelor's and master's degrees and currently has the following education programs in nursing: Bachelor of Science (BS), Master of Science (MS), Post Masters Advanced Certificate, and Doctor of Nursing Practice (DNP).

=== College of Health Professions ===
The College of Health Professions was formed in 1971. However, programs in the Health Professions have been in existence on this campus since 1956. Students can choose from nine health care fields: Behavior Analysis Studies (MS), Cardiovascular Perfusion (MS), Medical Biotechnology (BS and MS), Medical Imaging Sciences (BS), Physical Therapy (DPT), Physician Assistant (MS), Radiation Therapy (BS) and Respiratory Therapy (BS).

The College of Health Professions annually admits over 130 students into its programs. There are 32 full-time and 8 part-time faculty. In addition, there are more than 240 clinical and adjunct faculty who contribute to the college's educational programs.

== Research ==
As a biomedical research enterprise, Upstate focuses on the most prevalent human diseases, including cancer, diabetes, heart disease, nervous system disorders, vision, and infectious diseases. The quest for treatments and cures is built upon expertise in structural, molecular, and systems biology. Grants are concentrated in five basic science departments; Upstate's clinical departments host more than 450 active clinical trials. Upstate's research expenditures of more than $35 million ripple through the state economy and generated an additional $20.7 million in indirect and induced activity.

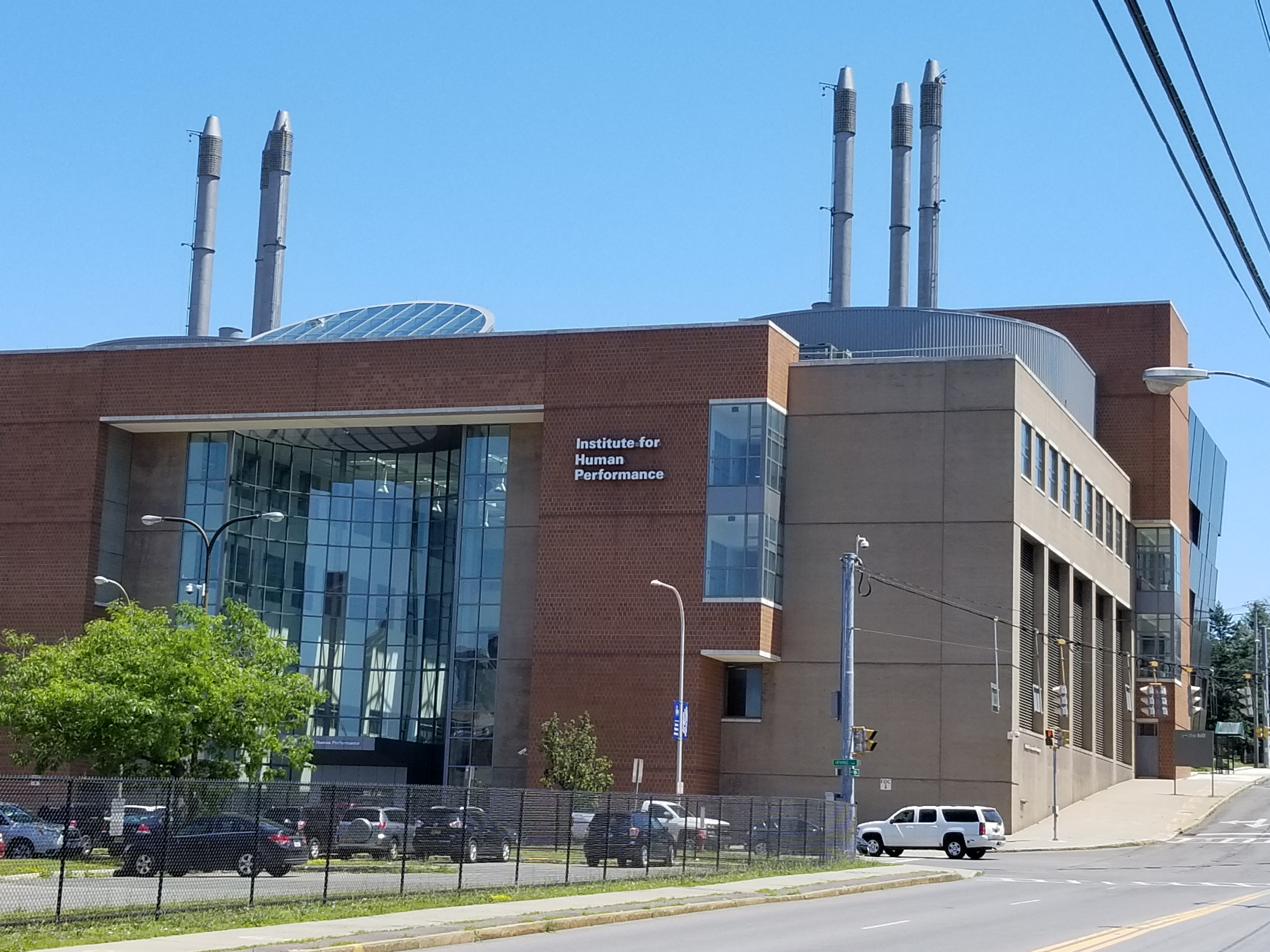
Institute for Human Performance

Upstate Medical University completed the construction of the Upstate Cancer Center, a five-story $74-million facility, in July 2014 and expanded it in 2018 to meet patient's demands and further research capability. In addition, the Nappi Longevity Institute at Upstate Medical University—a five floor, nearly 200,000 square foot health and wellness complex—will be completed in 2023. To fund the $154 million project, Upstate received a $70.6 million grant as part of the Capital Restructuring Financing Program and Essential Health Care Provider Support Program, and an additional $70.6 million in matching bonds from New York state. Upstate is currently designated as a Center of Excellence for Alzheimer's disease by New York State.

Governor Andrew M. Cuomo congratulated Upstate Medical on its No.1 ranking COVID-19 saliva test by the U.S. Food and Drug Administration for detecting the virus in its earliest stages. The test developed by Upstate Medical and NY Start-Up Quadrant Biosciences, called Clarifi COVID-19, was also cited by the FDA as being among the most sensitive tests.

On March 12, 2021, Upstate announced the opening of the Upstate Medical Vector Biocontainment Lab established to research infectious diseases that pose major public health risks. The new $7.6 million 2,500-square-foot laboratory was funded by New York State investment and will house clinical experts from State University of New York institutions who will collaborate on cutting-edge research of Coronavirus, Lyme, West Nile, Zika, Dengue, and other infectious diseases. The VBL also features a Human Challenge Room, where a human test subject may receive a mosquito bite, allowing for natural disease transmission and a potentially more accurate understanding of the disease and how to treat it. "You would find this only at the CDC or in an Army laboratory," Thangamani, MD said of the Human Challenge Room. "It’s rare to find this in an academic setting."

On March 3, 2022, the United States Patent and Trademark Office (USPTO) issued a patent to Upstate Research Foundation, Quadrant Biosciences, and Penn State Research Foundation for developing a novel epigenetic saliva test for autism. The patent covers the scientific foundation for the development of a saliva-based, multiomic autism diagnostic AI that can differentiate individuals with autism from individuals with typical development or developmental delays by measuring microRNA (miRNA) and microbiome levels in saliva.

=== Cross-Functional Collaboration ===
In 2013, Upstate Medical University, in partnership with SUNY College of Environmental Science and Forestry (ESF), Syracuse University, Cornell University, the University of Rochester and SUNY Buffalo received a $2 million federal grant to acquire an 800 MHz Nuclear Magnetic Resonance (NMR) spectrometer. The acquisition of the spectrometer filled a void in the region's research landscape, as this instrument will be the only one of its kind in Central and Western New York. "It speaks volumes about the power of a system when this grant was led by SUNY Upstate, the equipment will be housed at ESF, and its use will be open to scientists from across Central and Western New York," said SUNY Chancellor Nancy Zimpher. In addition, Upstate and ESF were recently awarded $15 million through a competitive grant program to create the SUNY Institute of Environmental Health & Environmental Medicine.

In addition, a joint Master of Public Health degree program and a joint PhD program in biomedical engineering are offered by SUNY Upstate and Syracuse University. The campuses of the two universities are adjacent to each other on University Hill in Syracuse. In 2021, a research collaboration between Upstate Medical University and Syracuse University on detecting Alzheimer's disease won the IAAI-21 Deployed Application Award on Innovative Applications of Artificial Intelligence. In their pape,r the team states, "Our research is the first to develop an effective machine learning approach that can identify the latent patterns due to preclinical AD from MRI brain scans, which can significantly improve AD patients’ intervention and treatment."

== Community ==
In 2025, the university announced the findings of its economic impact report. Upstate Medical University, the largest employer in Central New York and a leading institution in medical education and healthcare, contributes $3.2 billion to the state economy and supports, directly and indirectly, more than 24,000 jobs, according to the report.

In 2025, Upstate was named Business of the Year for Community Involvement by the business group CenterState CEO. The award honors Upstate for its ongoing involvement in dozens of community organizations aimed at addressing health disparities, educating schoolchildren about health care careers, hosting lectures and programs about health issues, and supporting local agencies through its Team Upstate to address community issues, from hunger to homelessness, veterans, and runaway youth.

== Selectivity ==
In 2021, the MD program received over 7,000 applications for 160 seats, an increase of over 26 percent from the previous year. In 2020, the incoming class had an average GPA of 3.77 and MCAT score of 513, which is 90th percentile nationally. Over 52.6 percent of applicants were "Out of State" with respect to state residency and the remaining 47.4% were NYS residents.

The College of Medicine has a 97% pass rate on the United States Medical Licensing Examination (USMLE) Step 1. In addition, Upstate had a match rate of 97 percent vs. 92.8 percent nationally for US MD schools in 2021 for first-year residency positions. U.S. News & World Report ranked the NCOM 31st in the Best Research category among all public medical schools nationally.

In 2020, the PA program was ranked #46 nationally in the Best Physician Assistant Programs by U.S. News & World Report. The Physical Therapy program (DPT) was ranked #57 nationally in the Best Physical Therapy Programs by US News. In addition, the MPH program was ranked #104 nationally in the Best Public Health Schools category by US News.

== Notable alumni ==
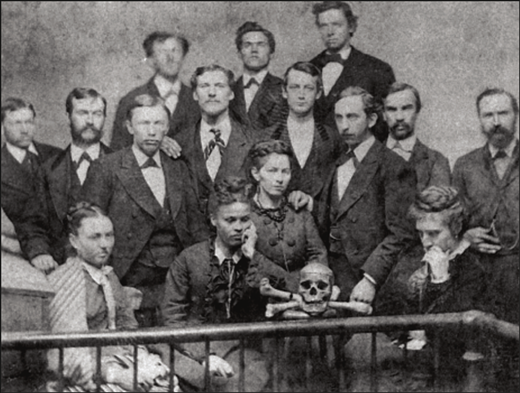
College of Medicine, Class of 1876

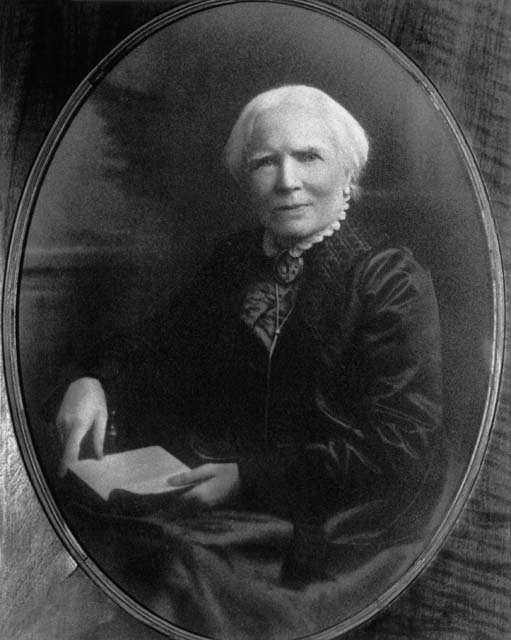
- Elizabeth Blackwell, MD, the first woman to be granted admissions to a US MD school
  Charles Antzelevitch, PhD - American cardiovascular research scientist in the fields of cardiac electrophysiology and arrhythmia syndromes.
- A. V. Apkarian, PhD - Professor of physiology, anesthesiology, and physical medicine and rehabilitation at Northwestern University in the Feinberg School of Medicine.
- Sir Frederick Ballantyne, M.D. - Governor-General of Saint Vincent and the Grenadines
- Elizabeth Blackwell, M.D. - first woman in the United States to be awarded the degree of Medical Doctor; founder of the New York Infirmary, now Lower Manhattan Hospital
- Penny Budoff, M.D. - famously known for her seminal research to alleviate menstrual pain
- Luther H. Cary -
- George W. Cole, major general by brevet in the American Civil War.
- Mary Fowkes, MD/PhD - American physician and neuropathologist. She is noted for her early autopsies of COVID-19 victims that significantly contributed to the identification of long-term effects of the novel coronavirus
- Sarah Loguen Fraser, M.D. - in 1876, became the first woman to gain an M.D. from Syracuse University School of Medicine; believed to be the fourth African-American woman to become a licensed physician in the United States
- Marcus J. Goldman, M.D. - Associate Professor at Tufts University School of Medicine
- David B. Levine, M.D. - Director of the Department of Orthopedic Surgery at Hospital for Special Surgery
- Pamela Lipkin, M.D. - facial plastic surgeon specializing in nose work.
- Clemence Sophia Harned Lozier, M.D. - Founded the New York Medical College and Hospital for Women and served as president of the New York City Suffrage League and the National Women's Suffrage Association.
- Elizabeth R. McAnarney, M.D. - pediatrician who is recognized for her leadership in the fields of adolescent medicine and pediatrics
- Patricia Numann, M.D. - founder of the Association of Women Surgeons, former president of the American College of Surgeons, and professor emeritus at the Upstate Medical University.
- James B. Preston, M.D. - Professor emeritus and Chairman of the Department of Physiology, SUNY Upstate Medical University.
- Mark C. Rogers, M.D. - influential in the development of pediatric intensive care as an independent medical specialty in the United States.
- Thomas Szasz, M.D. - Professor Emeritus of Psychiatry
- Nancy J. Tarbell, M.D. - C.C. Wang Professor of Radiation Oncology at Harvard Medical School and Massachusetts General Hospital.
- Samuel O. Thier, M.D. - President of Brandeis University from 1991 to 1994, the President of the Massachusetts General Hospital from 1994 to 1996, and Professor of Medicine and Health Care Policy at Harvard University.
- Mary Edwards Walker, M.D. - First female surgeon in the U.S. Army and only woman to receive the Medal of Honor.
- Sid Watkins, M.D. - Professor of Neurosurgery, 1962–1970; later became head of the Formula One on-track medical team
- Herman Gates Weiskotten, served as dean of Syracuse University medical school from 1922 to 1951
- Michael Weitzman, M.D. - American pediatrician specializing in public health and policy known for his research focusing on the social and environmental determinants of child health.
- Thomas Bramwell Welch, M.D. - British–American minister and dentist
- Warren Winkelstein, MD/MPH - American epidemiologist, professor in the School of Public Health at the University of California, Berkeley, and a member of the Institute of Medicine of the U.S. National Academy of Sciences
- Frank E. Young, M.D. - Commissioner of Food and Drugs from 1984 to 1989 and later Deputy Assistant Secretary in the United States Department of Health and Human Services.
