= A. V. Apkarian =

American neuroscientist

- Education: University of Southern California (MS); State University of New York Upstate Medical University (PhD)
- Scientific career
- Fields: Physiology, Anesthesiology, and Physical Medicine and Rehabilitation
- Workplaces: Northwestern University

Apkar Vania Apkarian is a professor of anesthesiology, and physical medicine and rehabilitation at the Northwestern University Feinberg School of Medicine. He has been a pioneer in the use of magnetic resonance spectroscopy to study the neurochemistry of the brain and the development of novel analytical approaches to studying consciousness, including the first demonstration of the brain's small-world network properties using fMRI.

In 2008, Apkarian proposed the theory that chronic pain is a form of emotional learning, which popularized the study of reward learning within the pain research field. Apkarian earned a master's degree in electrical engineering from the University of Southern California and earned a Ph.D. in neuroscience from the State University of New York Upstate Medical University. He is the brother of Vartkess Ara Apkarian, a laser spectroscopist at the University of California, Irvine.

== Career ==
Apkarian's early work with primate electrophysiology established that thalamic neurons can be physiologically characterized based on morphology and projections to the cortex, which led to the discovery that the thalamus dynamically encodes nociceptive stimuli in response to features of sensory stimuli. In the 1990s, his research transitioned to human brain imaging-based investigations of pain qualia and neural mechanisms underlying chronic pain.

Apkarian's research helped established neuroplasticity as a mechanism of chronic pain. In 2012, his group published the first evidence that functional connectivity between the medial prefrontal cortex and nucleus accumbens prospectively predicts the development of chronic back pain.

Apkarian's research has increasingly focused on the translation of neuroimaging findings to improve clinical treatment of chronic pain, including the development of preventative treatments and the strategic use of placebo treatment.

As per a Technology Review magazine:

A. Vania Apkarian and his colleagues at Northwestern University have found a series of abnormalities in the brains of chronic pain sufferers: the part of the prefrontal cortex linked to decision making appears to have shrunk in chronic pain patients. And another part of the prefrontal cortex linked to emotion is hyperactive. In fact, a unique study assessing background pain in chronic back-pain patients suggests that the constant pain these people experience is linked to activity almost entirely in emotion-regulating parts of the brain.
