= Mark C. Rogers =

American physician, professor, and hospital administrator

- Born: October 25, 1942 (age 83); The Bronx, New York, United States
- Education: Columbia University (BA); State University of New York Upstate Medical University (MD); Wharton Business School (MBA)
- Occupations: Physician; entrepreneur; professor; hospital administrator

Mark Charles Rogers (born October 25, 1942) is an American physician, medical entrepreneur, professor, and hospital administrator. He is a pediatrician, anesthesiologist, and cardiologist with a specialty in critical care medicine. With a medical career focused on pediatric intensive care, Rogers was founder of the Pediatric Intensive Care Unit at Johns Hopkins Hospital, working there from 1977 to 1991. He concurrently served as chairman of the Department of Anesthesiology and Critical Care Medicine beginning in 1980 and was a professor of anesthesiology and pediatrics throughout his tenure at Johns Hopkins.

Rogers graduated from Columbia University and earned his medical degree from the State University of New York Upstate Medical University in Syracuse before serving in the United States Army Medical Corp. At the end of his subsequent two-decade career in medicine at Johns Hopkins, he earned an MBA from Wharton Business School of the University of Pennsylvania in 1991 and began a new career as CEO of Duke Hospital and Health Network until 1996. He was then recruited to a New York Stock Exchange Company as Senior Vice-President (Perkin-Elmer) and as Chief Technology Officer. This is the company that sequenced the Human Genome in collaboration with the National Institutes of Health.

Rogers was influential in the development of pediatric intensive care as an independent medical specialty in the United States and published numerous academic papers and books on the subject. He helped establish the medical sub-board examinations for pediatric critical care medicine and was also an editor of a textbook on the subject, the now eponymously renamed Rogers' Textbook of Pediatric Intensive Care, which is in its fifth edition headed by new editors. The Mark C. Rogers Chair in Anesthesiology and Critical Care Medicine at Johns Hopkins is named in his honor.

== Early life ==
Mark Charles Rogers was born on October 25, 1942, in New York City and grew up in the Bronx. He earned entrance into the Bronx High School of Science, an academically competitive magnet school. Neither of his parents had attended higher education. An early influence on Rogers' education was his uncle, a physician who was the first in the family to attend college. Before beginning his medical education, Rogers attended Columbia University and earned an undergraduate degree in medieval history in 1964.

== Medical education and military service ==
Over the next five years, Rogers studied towards a medical degree at the Upstate Medical Center of the State University of New York in Syracuse. His studies were funded by a National Institutes of Health (NIH) grant with 6-month-long stints each year working at an NIH Research Fellowship. He graduated with a medical degree in 1969 and began a pediatric internship at Massachusetts General Hospital (MGH). After one year at MGH, he began a pediatric residency at Boston Children's Hospital in 1970. Working toward his desire to become a pediatric intensivist, Rogers entered a pediatric cardiology fellowship at Duke University Medical Center from 1971 to 1973 and then returned to MGH to complete a two-year anesthesiology residency. During his internship and residency at the Harvard hospitals, Rogers had two articles published as senior author in the New England Journal of Medicine. They were entitled Cold Injury of the Newborn and Serum Digoxin Concentrations in the Human Fetus, Neonate and Infant.

Rogers was a major in the United States Army from 1975 to 1977. As part of the Medical Corps, he was stationed at the Ireland Army Hospital in Fort Knox, Kentucky, where Rogers had a general pediatrics practice and was the director of Newborn Services.

== Medical career ==
Rogers became the first director of the Pediatric Intensive Care Unit (PICU) at Johns Hopkins Hospital in 1977. He also began teaching as an assistant professor and was promoted to associate professor in 1979. Rogers was appointed as the Chair of the Department of Anesthesiology in 1980, which he soon renamed the Department of Anesthesiology and Critical Care Medicine. At the same time, he was also promoted to professor of pediatrics and anesthesiology.

According to the journal Pediatric Anesthesia, "The original PICU at Hopkins was rudimentary and not much larger than a living room and closet. It had six beds—four in one big room and two in the other. It had a very small nursing staff that was not dedicated to pediatric intensive care." In 1985, Rogers was responsible for opening a new and expanded 16-bed pediatric critical care unit. He also hired Richard Traystman, a professor in physiology, as director of research and together they transformed the Department of Anesthesiology and Critical Care Medicine into "one of the top NIH-funded anesthesia department in the United States.

In 1992, he founded the first World Congress of Pediatric Intensive Care. Rogers developed the medical sub-board examinations for pediatric critical care medicine and was also an editor of a textbook on the subject. While at Johns Hopkins, he began publishing the Handbook of Pediatric Intensive Care, first published in 1989. The book was subsequently renamed as the Rogers' Textbook of Pediatric Intensive Care. Although no longer under Rogers' editorship, it continues to carry his name and is now in its fifth edition. Two colleagues of Rogers, Donald H. Shaffner and David Nichols serve as co-editors in chief of Rogers' Textbook. Rogers has trained and mentored more than 45 doctors that completed residencies and fellowships in pediatric critical care specialties at Johns Hopkins. In 1995, Rogers was elected to the National Academy of Sciences of the Institute of Medicine (now the National Academy of Medicine).

== Later career ==
While an associate dean and professor at Johns Hopkins, Rogers was a visiting Fulbright Scholar at Ljubljana University Medical Center in the former Yugoslavia (now Slovenia). After graduating in 1991 with a Master of Business Administration degree from the Wharton Business School of the University of Pennsylvania, Rogers became CEO of the Duke Hospital and Health Network and vice-chancellor for health affairs. In 1996, he initiated a novel capitated contractual agreement with Baxter International to provide all of the hospital's operating room supplies at a capped budget. This novel agreement gave Baxter a bonus when costs are below budget, incentivizing the supplier to keep the hospital's supply costs down.

Rogers later served as senior vice-president and chief technology officer of Perkin-Elmer, a Norwalk, Connecticut-based maker of DNA sequencers. He went on to head several private companies, including being the founder and chairman of PolaRX, a company that developed the FDA-approved drug arsenic trioxide for the treatment of acute promyelocytic leukemia. The company was later sold for $100 million. He was also the founder of Innovative Drug Delivery Systems, a pharmaceutical development company later sold to a larger company for approximately $230 million. Rogers was also the chairman of Cardiome, a cardiovascular drug development company. In 2004, he became chairman of Aptamera, a cancer drug developer based in Louisville, Kentucky. Aptamera was the developer of AGRO100, an experimental anticancer drug in human clinical trials. Rogers was also appointed Chair of the Reagan-Udall Foundation, a civilian advisory board to the Federal Drug Administration.

== Personal life ==
Rogers is married to Elizabeth Rogers, a physician who was a professor at the University of Maryland and an associate dean at Duke University School of Medicine. They live in Fisher Island, Florida. Together, they have two children, Bradley and Meredith, and five grandchildren; Paul, Max, and Jack Rogers and Emma and Ian Borden.

== Bibliography ==
- Rogers, Mark C. (1983–1995). The Year Book of Critical Care Medicine. Year Book Medical Publishers. ISBN 978-0-8151-7255-0.
- Rogers, Mark C.; Traystman, Richard J. (1985). Symposium on Neurologic Intensive Care. Saunders. OCLC 12969563.
- Adams, Anthony P.; Hewitt, Penelope B.; Rogers, Mark C. (1986). Emergency Anaesthesia. Arnold. ISBN 978-0-03-013297-1. OCLC 17804222.
- Rogers, Mark C. (1988). Current Practice in Anesthesiology. B.C. Decker. ISBN 978-1-55664-017-9. OCLC 255582574.
- Rogers, Mark C; 吉矢, 生人 (1992). ロジャース臨床麻酔学各論 [Rogers Clinical Anesthesiology] (in Japanese). 真興交易医書出版部. ISBN 978-4-88003-389-1. OCLC 674698283.
- Breslow, Michael J.; Miller, Clair F.; Rogers, Mark C. (1990). Perioperative Management. Mosby. ISBN 978-0-8016-5049-9.
- Rogers, Mark C (1990). Terapia Intensiva en Pediatría (in Spanish). Buenos Aires: Editorial Médica Hispanoamericana. OCLC 933832929.
- Rogers, Mark C; Helfaer, Mark A (1993). Case Studies in Pediatric Intensive Care. Williams and Wilkins. ISBN 978-0-683-07323-2. OCLC 611933024.
- Rogers, Mark C. (1993). Principles and Practice of Anesthesiology. Vol. 2 Volumes. Mosby. ISBN 978-0-8016-5818-1.
- Rogers, Mark C.; Helfaer, Mark A. (1995). Handbook of Pediatric Intensive Care. Williams & Wilkins. ISBN 978-0-683-07326-3.
- Rogers, Mark C; Helfaer, Mark A. (2000). Cuidados Intensivos en Pediatría (in Spanish). Translated by González H., Jose Luis. McGraw-Hill Interamericana. ISBN 978-970-10-2883-4. OCLC 46860865.
