= Herman Gates Weiskotten =

American academic (1884–1972)

Herman Gates Weiskotten (1884–1972) was dean of Syracuse University medical school from 1922 to 1951. During his final year, the school was renamed SUNY Upstate Medical University.

After serving as Acting Dean for three years, Weiskotten became Dean. He held this post until 1951 and brought the College of Medicine through the difficult depression years of the 1930s into the modern medical world.

Weiskotten was professor of pathology from 1916 to 1951 and chair of the department from 1924 to 1942. In addition to his local achievements, Weiskotten also raised national standards of medical education through his involvement with the Association of American Medical Colleges (AAMC), the American Medical Association (AMA), and several other organizations. From 1934 to 1940, he chaired a commission of the AMA Council on Medical Education and Hospitals to write a follow-up to the 1910 "Flexner Report." In 1940, his team published Medical Education in the United States, 1934-1939, known as the "Weiskotten Report," which showed that only 66 of the 79 American medical schools had full four-year programs and that about 20 of the 89 American and Canadian medical schools were below AMA standards. Measures were quickly instituted to rectify those situations.
