= Fairview Manor =

Historic house in New York, United States

- U.S. National Register of Historic Places
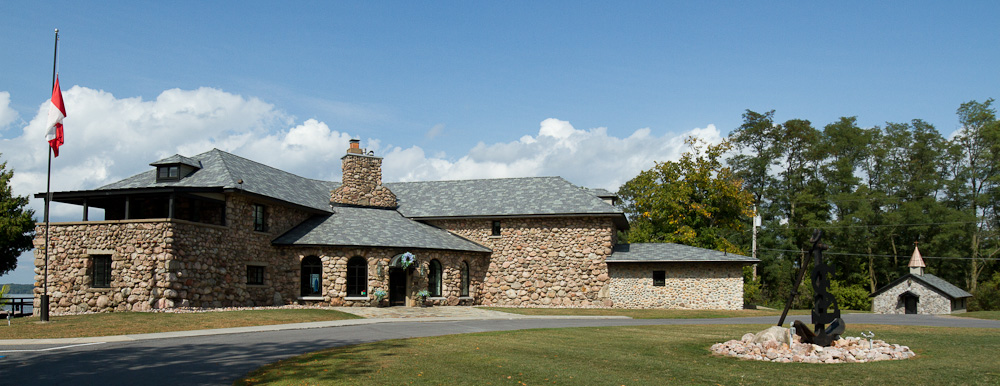
- Fairview Manor

- Location within New York Location within the United States
- Location: 38289 NY 12-E, Clayton, New York
- Coordinates: 44°13′21.63″N 76°7′17.79″W
- Area: 16.8 acres (6.8 ha)
- Built: 1937
- Architect: Anstey, Walter
- Architectural style: French Eclectic
- NRHP reference No.: 07000866
- Added to NRHP: August 30, 2007

Fairview Manor also known as Longue Vue Manor, Our Lady of Fairview, and Fairview Manor Restaurant and Lodge, is a historic home located at Clayton in Jefferson County, New York. It was built in 1937 as a summer retreat for Carl Zimmerman. It is a very interesting and intact interpretation of a European castle/Manor house with a distinctive eclectic French flavor.

It was listed on the National Register of Historic Places in 2007.

As of April 2011, the property was permanently closed, and had been for quite some time, due to the overgrown nature of the surroundings. The property includes approximately 16 acres, several out buildings, guest cabins, a chapel, and a river front location.

In July 2014, current owners purchased 7.6 acres, after the property was subdivided, including the French Eclectic Manor, the chapel, cottages near the manor, and of course the St. Lawrence River view! The property had fallen into disrepair after nearly 8 years of vacancy. The original slate roof was harvested and replaced with a composite slate roof, the original slate will be repurposed as cheese boards, coasters, etc. All the windows were replaced by Marvin Windows, replicating their original style. A new geothermal heating and cooling system was installed. Interior and Exterior renovations were complete to preserve the history.

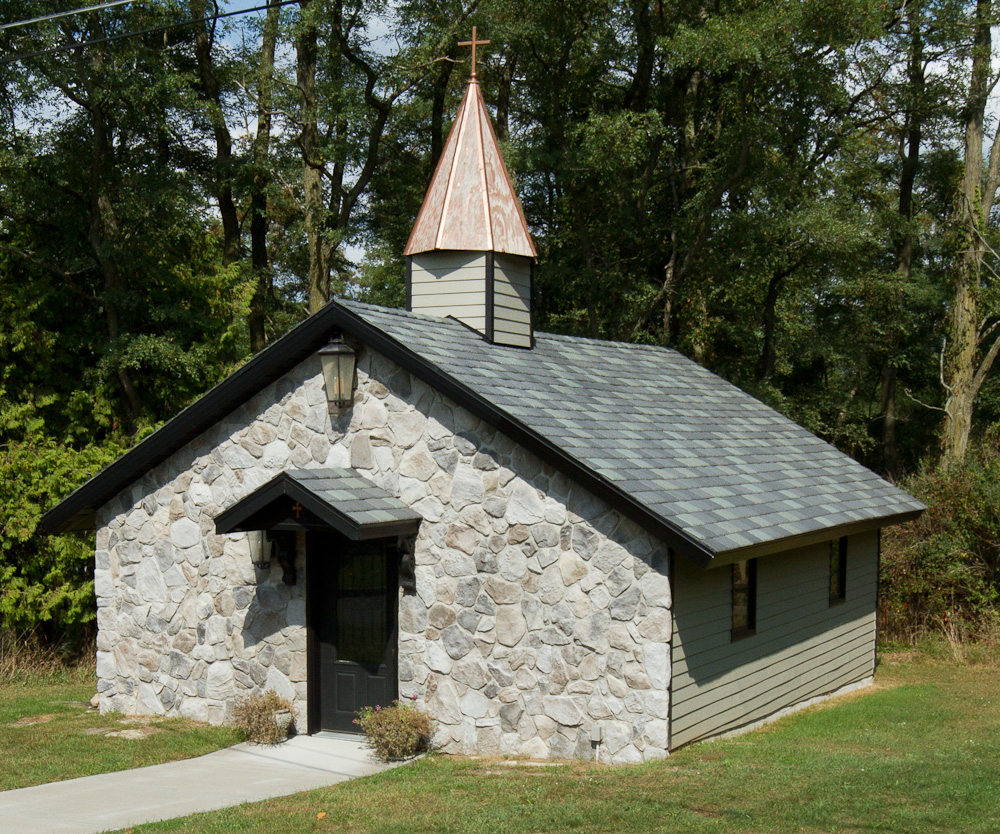
Fairview Manor Chapel

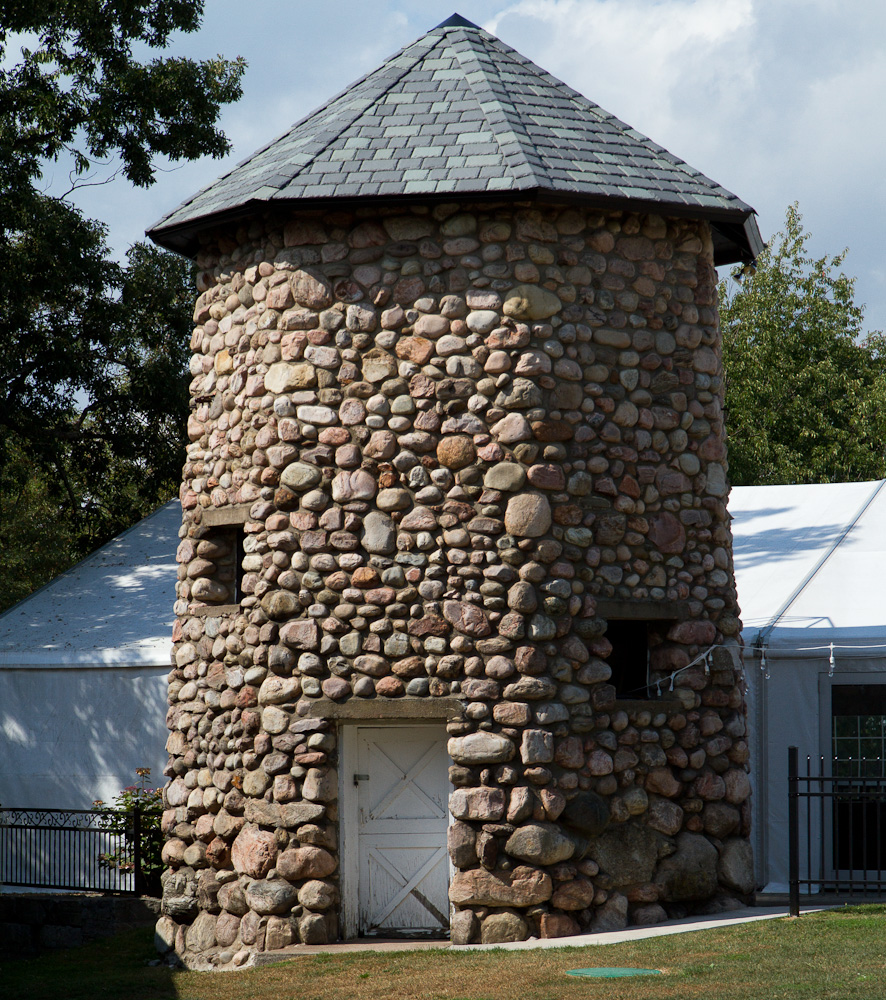
Fairview Manor Out Building
