= Warren Winkelstein =

American epidemiologist

Warren Winkelstein Jr.
- Born: 1 July 1922; Syracuse, New York, United States
- Died: 22 July 2012 (aged 90); Point Richmond, California
- Education: State University of New York Upstate Medical University (MD)
- Known for: Work on the polio vaccine, air pollution and AIDS pandemic
- Scientific career
- Fields: Epidemiology, public health
- Workplaces: University of California, Berkeley

Warren Winkelstein Jr. (1 July 1922 – 22 July 2012) was an American epidemiologist, professor in the School of Public Health at the University of California, Berkeley, and a member of the Institute of Medicine of the U.S. National Academy of Sciences. During the 1960s Winkelstein was considered one of the leading epidemiologists of the time.

Winkelstein was born in Syracuse, New York, the son of a prominent lawyer. After graduating from the Putney School, he served in the U.S. Army during World War II. He subsequently attended the University of North Carolina, where he majored in sociology. He then attended Syracuse University for medical school, graduating in 1947. He also obtained a Master's of Public Health from Columbia University in 1950. After working in Buffalo, New York for several years under Abraham Morris Lilienfeld, he accepted an appointment at the School of Public Health at the University of California, Berkeley, serving as Dean of the school from 1972 to 1981.

Winkelstein has made important contributions in a number of areas of epidemiology. Early in his academic career, he participated in clinical trials of the polio vaccine. During his time in Buffalo, Winkelstein studied the health impact of the city's air pollution, successfully separating the effect of pollution from other confounding social and environmental factors, and also contributed greatly to the understanding of coronary artery disease in women. At Berkeley, Winkelstein did pioneering research on the link between tobacco smoke and cervical cancer. It took over two decades for those findings to be widely accepted.

In the 1980s and thereafter, Winkelstein's work was focused mainly on HIV and the AIDS pandemic. Winkelstein led the San Francisco Men's Health Study, one of the largest and best-described cohorts of people at risk for HIV/AIDS. By studying this cohort, Winkelstein and his collaborators were able to contribute greatly to the understanding of the epidemiology of HIV and AIDS, in particular the modes of viral transmission, risk factors for progression to AIDS, and duration of the incubation period. Winkelstein also addressed Peter Duesberg's arguments that AIDS was related to drug use rather than HIV infection, demonstrating, along with immunologist Michael Ascher and other colleagues, that "such claims have no basis in fact."

Since retiring and assuming emeritus status, Winkelstein worked on biographical sketches of major figures in the history of epidemiology, including John Snow, Edward Jenner, and his mentor, Abraham Lilienfeld. He died in 2012 at home in Point Richmond, California of complications of an infection at the age of 90.
