= Upstate University Hospital =

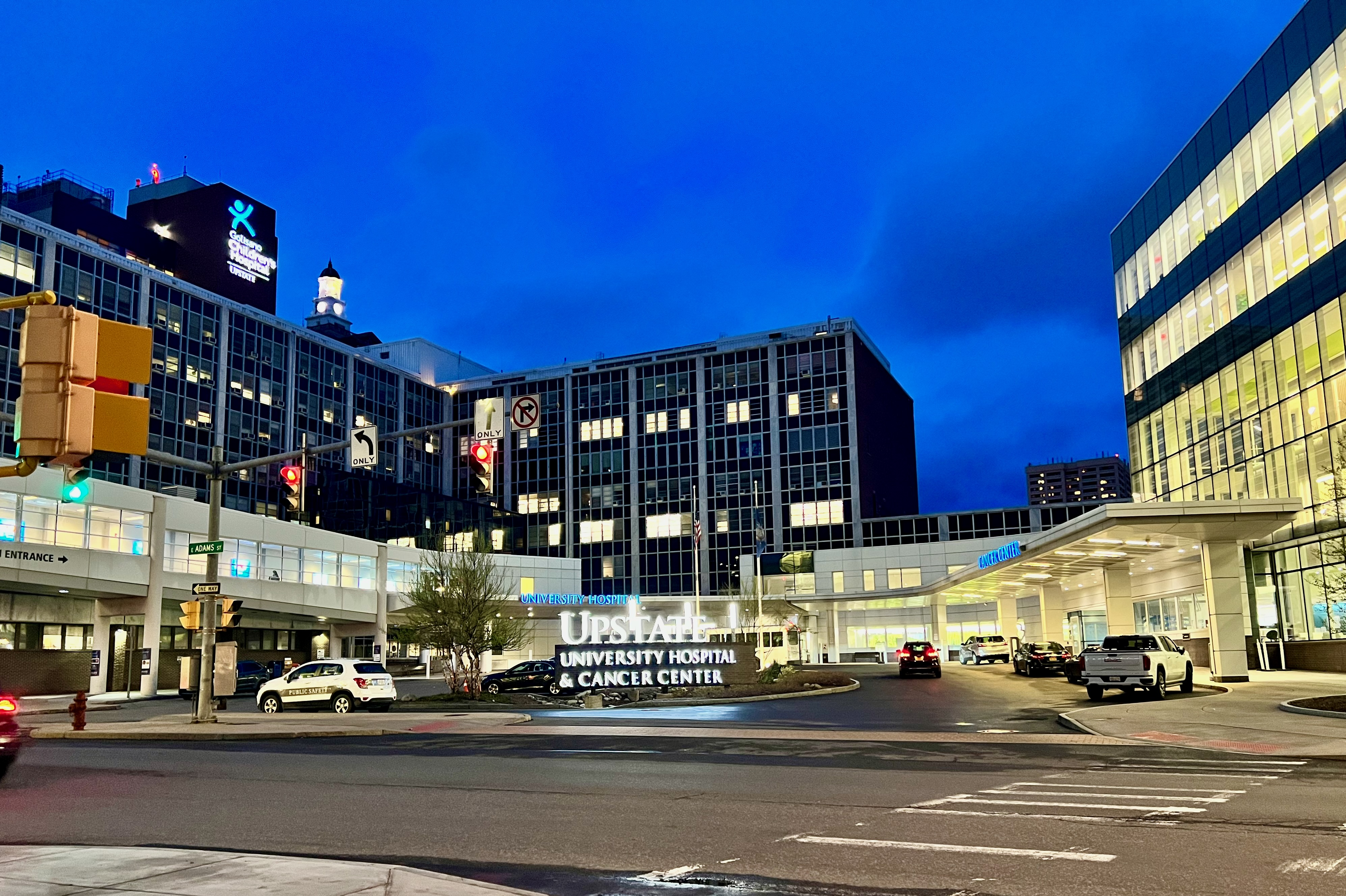
- The main entrance of the hospital.

Geography
- Location: 750 E. Adams Street, Syracuse, New York, United States
- Coordinates: 43°02′31″N 76°08′23″W

Organization
- Affiliated university: State University of New York Upstate Medical University

Services
- Emergency department: Level I trauma center
- Beds: 752

Helipads
- Helipad: FAA LID: 75NK
Number	Length		Surface
Number	ft	m	Surface
H1	54 x 54	16 × 16	mats

History
- Constructed: 1961
- Opened: 1965; 61 years ago

Links
- Website: www.upstate.edu/hospital/
- Lists: Hospitals in New York State

Upstate University Hospital is a 752-bed non-profit, teaching hospital located in Syracuse, New York. Upstate University Hospital is the flagship hospital of the Upstate Health System. As the hospital is a teaching hospital, it is affiliated with the Norton College of Medicine at State University of New York Upstate Medical University. The hospital is also an American College of Surgeons verified Level 1 Trauma Center, the only in the region and one of 21 in New York. Attached to the hospital is the Upstate Golisano Children's Hospital that treats infants, children, teens, and young adults aged 0–21.

== History ==
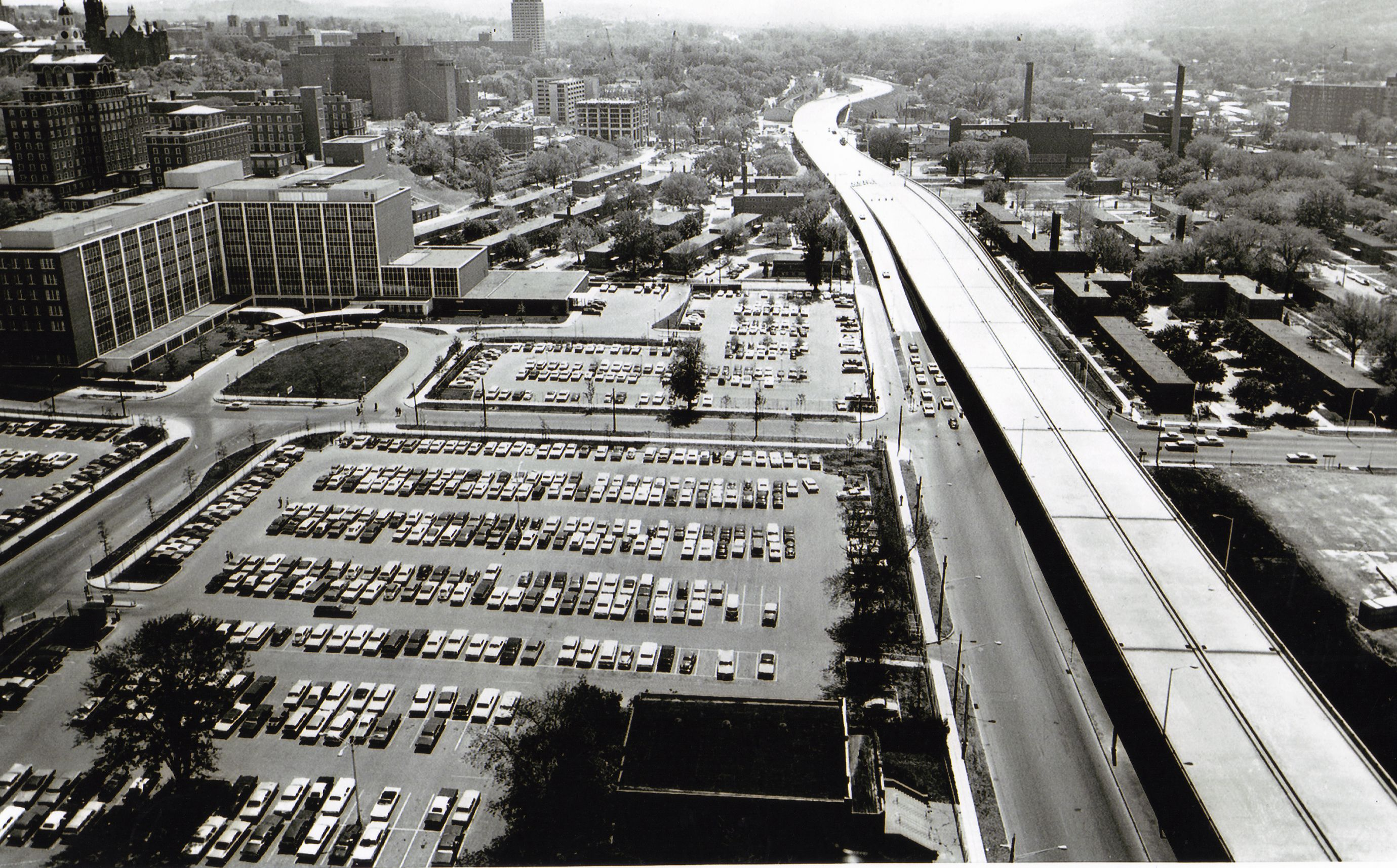
Aerial view of the hospital in 1967. On the right, Interstate 81 can be seen nearing completion. The parking lots have since been overbuilt with other buildings.

While the affiliated medical school, Norton College of Medicine, had existed for years prior, the plan to operate a medical center affiliated with the university was thought of as far back as 1915, when university Dean, John Heffron proposed the idea.

Years later on May 19, 1951, the plans for the new University Hospital were approved, laying the groundwork for the construction of the hospital.

On July 1, 1961, ground was broken for the construction of the Upstate University Hospital. The hospital opened in 1965 with 375 beds under the name "State University Hospital" at a total cost of $20 million ($204 million in 2025).

In June 1976, hospital officials established the Upstate Medical Center Foundation to accept donations to help advance patient care to underserved communities. In 1984, the foundation funded the construction of a new pediatric intensive care unit with a capacity of seven beds at a cost of $1 million.

In November 1994, the new East Wing of Upstate University Hospital was opened and used a staggered occupancy plan.

In 2003, plans to expand the East Wing vertically five floors were approved with a planned cost of $84 million. In 2006, the expanded East wing opened becoming the Upstate Golisano Children's Hospital thanks to a $6 million gift from local philanthropist, Tom Golisano. Ultimately, the new children's hospital opened in 2009 at a cost of $150 million with 71 private rooms and 87,000 square feet of space.

In 2020, hospital officials announced that Upstate Golisano Children's Hospital would treat non-COVID adult patients, expanding their age limit to age 30.

In light of the COVID-19 pandemic, on August 19, 2021, SUNY Upstate was awarded $2 million from the Federal Communications Commission (FCC) to help upgrade and support its tele-health infrastructure with a focus on video consults and remote patient monitoring as part of its electronic medical record (EMR) system.

In November 2025, Upstate University opened its new Upstate Neurological Institute in Syracuse to combine neurology, neurosurgery services, and nervous system experts at one location.

== Upstate Golisano Children's Hospital ==
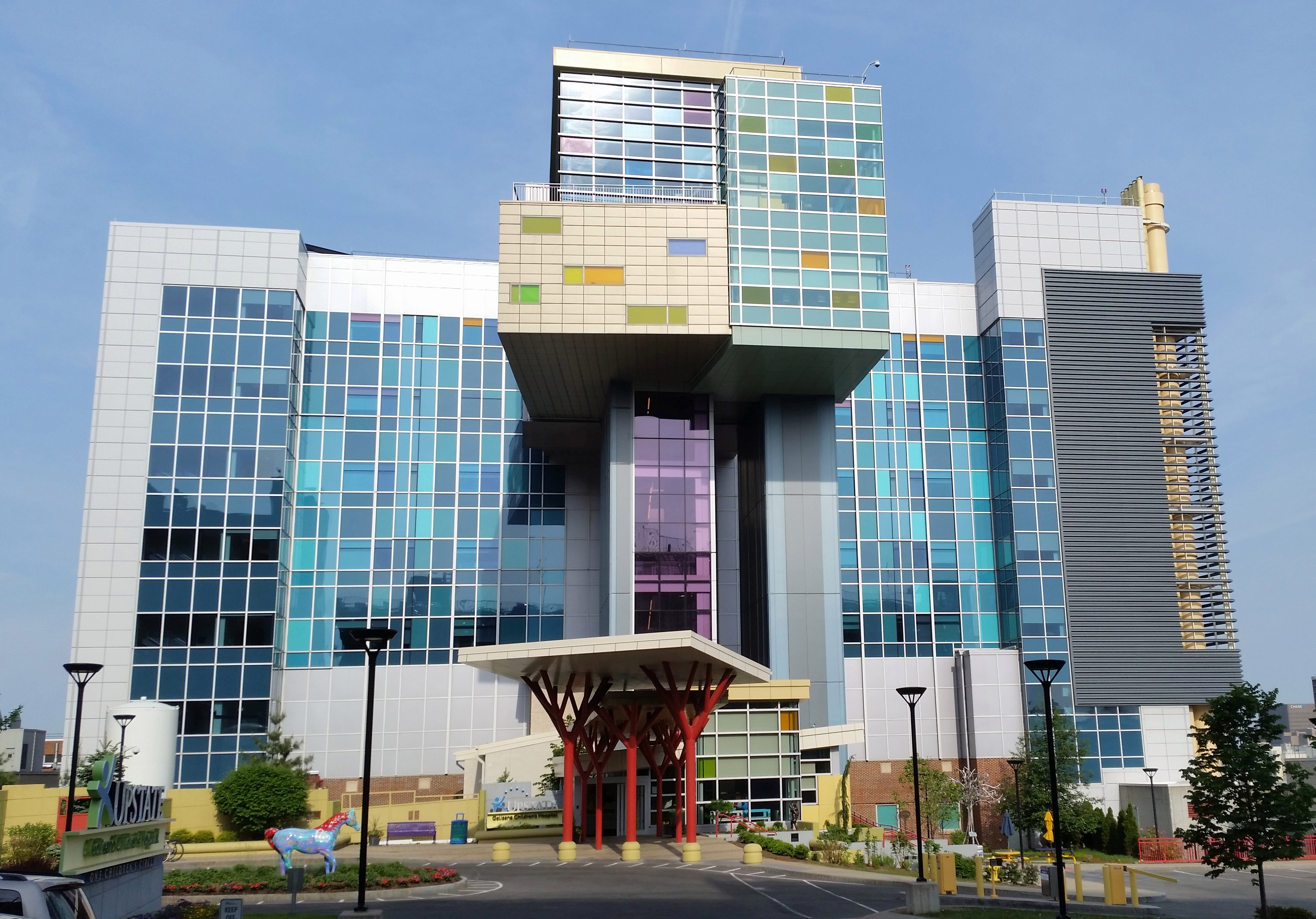
Upstate Golisano Children's Hospital

Upstate Golisano Children's Hospital (GCH) is an acute care children's hospital in Syracuse, New York. GCH features 71 pediatric beds. The hospital provides comprehensive pediatric specialties and subspecialties to infants, children, teens, and young adults aged 0–19. The hospital also sometimes treats adults that require pediatric care. The hospital shares the rooftop helipad for the attached Upstate University Hospital and is an ACS verified level I pediatric trauma center. The hospital also features a regional pediatric intensive-care unit.

A few blocks away from Golisano Children's Hospital is the Ronald McDonald House of Central New York, which has 25 guest rooms to serve families of pediatric patients aged 19 years or younger in treatment at Golisano Children's and the nearby Crouse Hospital.

== Upstate Community Campus ==
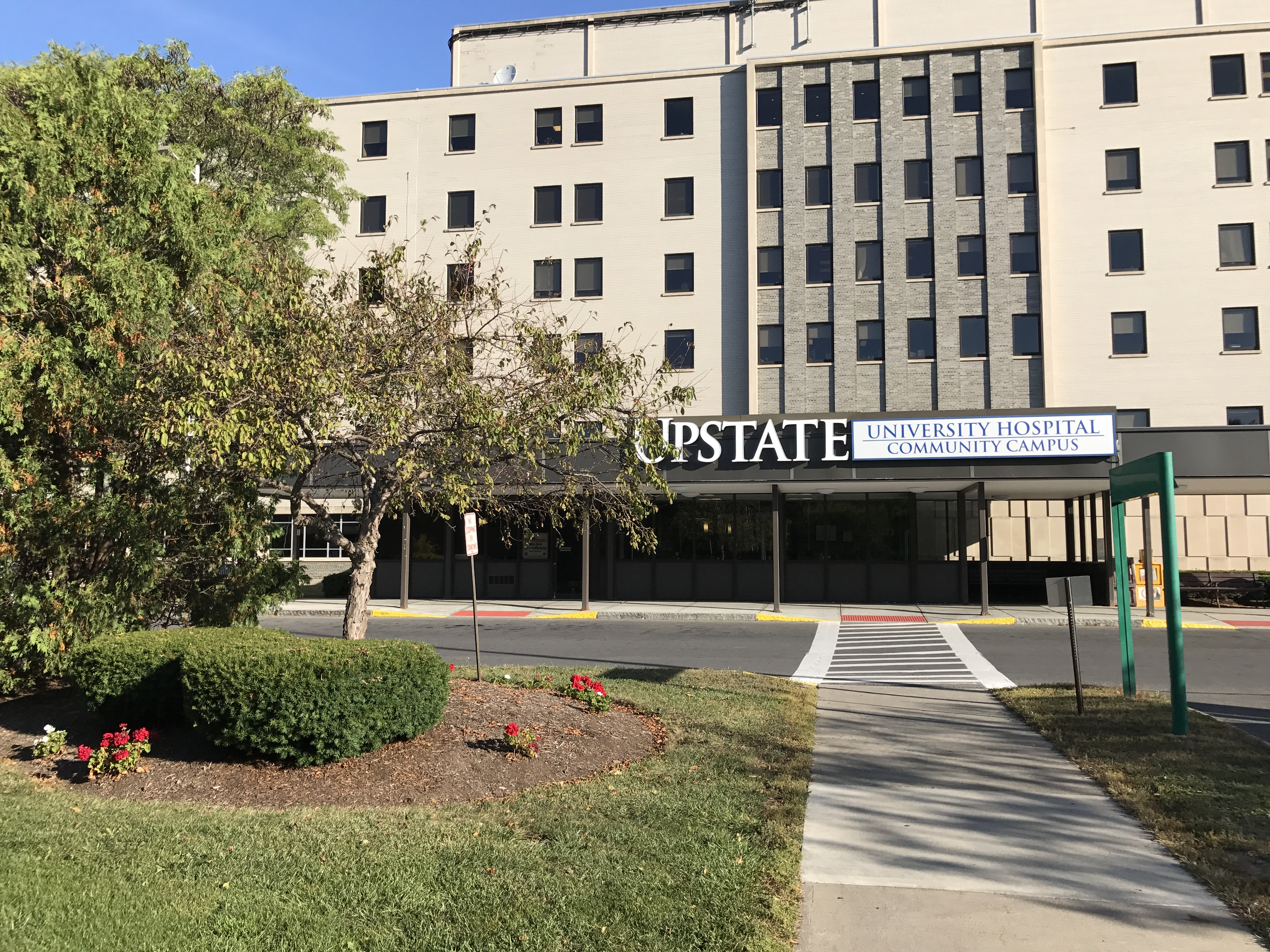
Upstate University Hospital, Community Campus

Community General Hospital opened is doors on January 1, 1963. In 2011, Upstate Medical University acquired Community General Hospital, and was renamed Upstate University Hospital at Community General on July 7, 2011.

Upstate Community Hospital offers services including its orthopedic program, spine surgery, bariatric surgery and maternity services. Upstate Community Hospital has a medical staff of 460 physicians who provide obstetric, psychiatric, orthopedic, gynecological and medical/surgical services to 12,000 patients each year. The hospital also offers a wide range of outpatient and community health education services, including nutrition counseling and weight loss programs.

== Upstate Cancer Center ==
Upstate Medical University completed the construction of the Upstate Cancer Center, a five-story, $74 million facility, in July 2014 and expanded it in 2018. Upstate also is part of the Children's Oncology Group.

Upstate's programs at the Cancer Center include:

- Breast Cancer Program
- Gynecology Oncology Program
- Head & Neck Program
- Liver, Gallbladder, Pancreas Cancer Program
- Neuro Oncology Program
- Prostate Cancer Program
- Thyroid Cancer Program
- Thoracic Oncology Program (TOP)

The Upstate Cancer Center is accredited by the American College of Surgeons: Commission on Cancer (ACOS CoC).

== Awards ==
In 2019 and 2020, the hospital received "Stroke Gold Plus Award," "Heart Failure Gold Plus Quality Award," and the "Resuscitation Bronze Award" from the American Heart Association and the American Stroke Association.

In December 2020, Upstate announced that the American College of Surgeons National Surgical Quality Improvement Program (NSQIP) named Upstate Community Hospital as one of 89 facilities nationwide for meritorious outcomes for surgical care. Upstate also has earned DNV accreditation as a Center of Excellence for Hip and Knee and as Blue Distinction Center, which also was achieved by its spine program. The pancreatic surgery program is recognized by the National Pancreatitis Foundation as a National Center of Excellence, and the breast cancer program is accredited nationally. In 2018, NSQIP recognized Upstate University Hospital as a high performer regarding care of high-risk surgical patients.

In January 2021, Upstate University Hospital was designated a Magnet hospital from the American Nurses Association (ANA), a designation that recognizes excellent nursing care.

The hospital received "High Performing" in 1 adult specialty and 7 procedures and conditions in the 2025 U.S. News & World Report: Best Hospital rankings.

Upstate is among the 1% of accredited cancer programs in the country who have achieved the Outstanding Achievement Award for four consecutive survey cycles.

== See also ==
- SUNY Upstate Medical University
- Syracuse University
- List of children's hospitals in the United States
