= Marcus J. Goldman =

American psychiatrist

- Born: November 27, 1960 (age 65)
- Education: Union College (BA); State University of New York Upstate Medical University (MD)
- Scientific career
- Fields: Psychiatry
- Workplaces: Tufts University, Harvard Medical School

Marcus Jacob Goldman (born November 27, 1960), is an American physician, board certified in psychiatry with past certifications in addiction, forensic and geriatric psychiatry and is also a writer. Goldman received his medical degree from the State University of New York Upstate Medical University in 1986.

He is currently an associate professor at Tufts University School of Medicine, where he has served on the admissions’ committee and has had past academic and teaching appointments at Harvard Medical School and the University of Massachusetts Medical School.

== Education ==
Goldman received his undergraduate degree from Union College in Schenectady, New York, and his medical degree from the State University of New York Upstate Medical University in 1986. Goldman served as an intern at the University of Medicine and Dentistry of New Jersey and completed both his residency and Forensic fellowship at Harvard Medical School.

== Career ==
Goldman has served as medical director for New England Geriatrics from 1998 to 2001. He has practiced addiction, geriatric and forensic psychiatry and has been a member of the Program in Psychiatry and the Law/Massachusetts Mental Health Center, Harvard Medical School since 1990.

== Publications and appearances ==
The author of nearly 20 academic papers, in August 1991, Goldman published a landmark paper on Kleptomania in the American Journal of Psychiatry (1991:148;986-996), which subsequently led to a book entitled “Kleptomania, the Compulsion to Steal”(New Horizon Press). After Winona Ryder's arrest on theft charges. Dr. Goldman appeared on Larry King Live (11/06/02). Other books include “The Joy of Fatherhood: the First Twelve Months”(Random House/Three Rivers), as well as “What to Do After You Say ‘I do’”(Prima), co-authored with his wife, Lori. Dr. Goldman has appeared in American Health Jan/Feb 1992, Self Feb 1994, The New York Times 1997, Parents Magazine 4/02 and 06/02, Cosmopolitan Magazine 9/02, Time Magazine November 11/18/02[, People Magazine 11/25/02, WebMD 05/03 and 06/04 and Discovery Channel on-line 2003. Television appearances include The O'Reilly Factor/Fox News TV 1997 and Larry King Live 2002. Goldman was also featured in a Discovery Health Channel documentary produced by Celia Lowenstein in the fall of 2003.
