= Mary Fowkes =

American doctor and neuropathologist (1954–2020)

- Born: November 1, 1954; Clayton, New York, U.S.
- Died: November 15, 2020 (aged 66); Katonah, New York, U.S.
- Education: State University of New York Upstate Medical University (MD/PhD)
- Occupations: Physician, neuropathologist
- Known for: Autopsies on COVID-19 victims Study of long-term debilitating effects of COVID-19

Mary Fowkes (November 1, 1954 – November 15, 2020) was an American physician and neuropathologist. She is noted for her early autopsies of COVID-19 victims that significantly contributed to the identification of long-term effects of the novel coronavirus. Her findings that victims had suffered multiple organ failures resulted in the recommendation for use of blood thinners as a part of the treatment process.

== Early life ==
Mary Fowkes was born in Clayton, New York, on November 1, 1954, to Isabel and Glen Fowkes. Her mother was a social worker and her father was an insurance underwriter. She grew up in Syracuse, and at first studied zoology and forestry while pursuing her undergraduate degree. She then a continued her studies as a physician assistant working with Hahnemann University of Philadelphia. She received her bachelor's degree at the SUNY College of Environmental Science and Forestry in Syracuse, and completed her MD/PhD at State University of New York Upstate Medical University.

She completed her residency at Beth Israel Deaconess Medical Center and followed it up with a neuropathology fellowship at the NYU Medical Center and a forensic pathology fellowship at the New York City chief medical examiner office. She joined the Icahn School of Medicine at Mount Sinai Hospital in Manhattan as an assistant professor of pathology and went on to become the director of neuropathology.

== Research ==
Fowkes and her team at the Icahn School of Medicine at Mount Sinai Hospital studied COVID-19 victims, when little was known about the virus and its impacts. Based on initial findings, the impact of the disease was considered to be largely respiratory—i.e. its impact was limited to the lungs. However, when Fowkes and her team performed autopsies on patients, they found that the virus had affected not only the lungs but also other vital organs, leading the team to believe that the virus had probably traversed the body through endothelial cells through the blood vessels. The team found that patients had microscopic blood clots in a few organs, including the lungs and heart, but had significant clots in the brain, indicating that the patients had suffered from strokes. The team found these observations in a diverse group of victims ranging from young victims, who typically are not a target age group for strokes, to older victims.

The findings from autopsies performed by Fowkes and her team led to the increased use of blood thinners as a part of the treatment process, resulting in improved responses in many patients. Fowkes' work, as well as that of her colleagues, helped reinforce the importance of autopsies in understanding the impact of the COVID-19 virus. The New York Times noted that working with oscillating saws to open the skulls of COVID-19 victims during autopsies, in order to remove the brain, potentially exposed her to the virus through aerosolized fragments of the bone and droplets of blood. In a conversation with the BBC World Service, Fowkes reinforced the importance of performing these autopsies despite the risks posed to the operating physicians.

== Death ==
Fowkes died on November 15, 2020, of a heart attack at her house in Katonah, New York, aged 66.

== Working papers ==
Unrefereed preprint of a paper detailing findings by Fowkes and team:

- Fowkes, Mary; Cordon-Cardo, Carlos; et al. (2021). "Pathophysiology of SARS-CoV-2: The Mount Sinai COVID-19 autopsy experience". Modern Pathology. 34 (8): 1456–1467. doi:10.1038/s41379-021-00793-y. medRxiv 10.1101/2020.05.18.20099960v1. PMC 8015313. PMID 33795830.
