= Joseph Lonsway =

American Civil War soldier

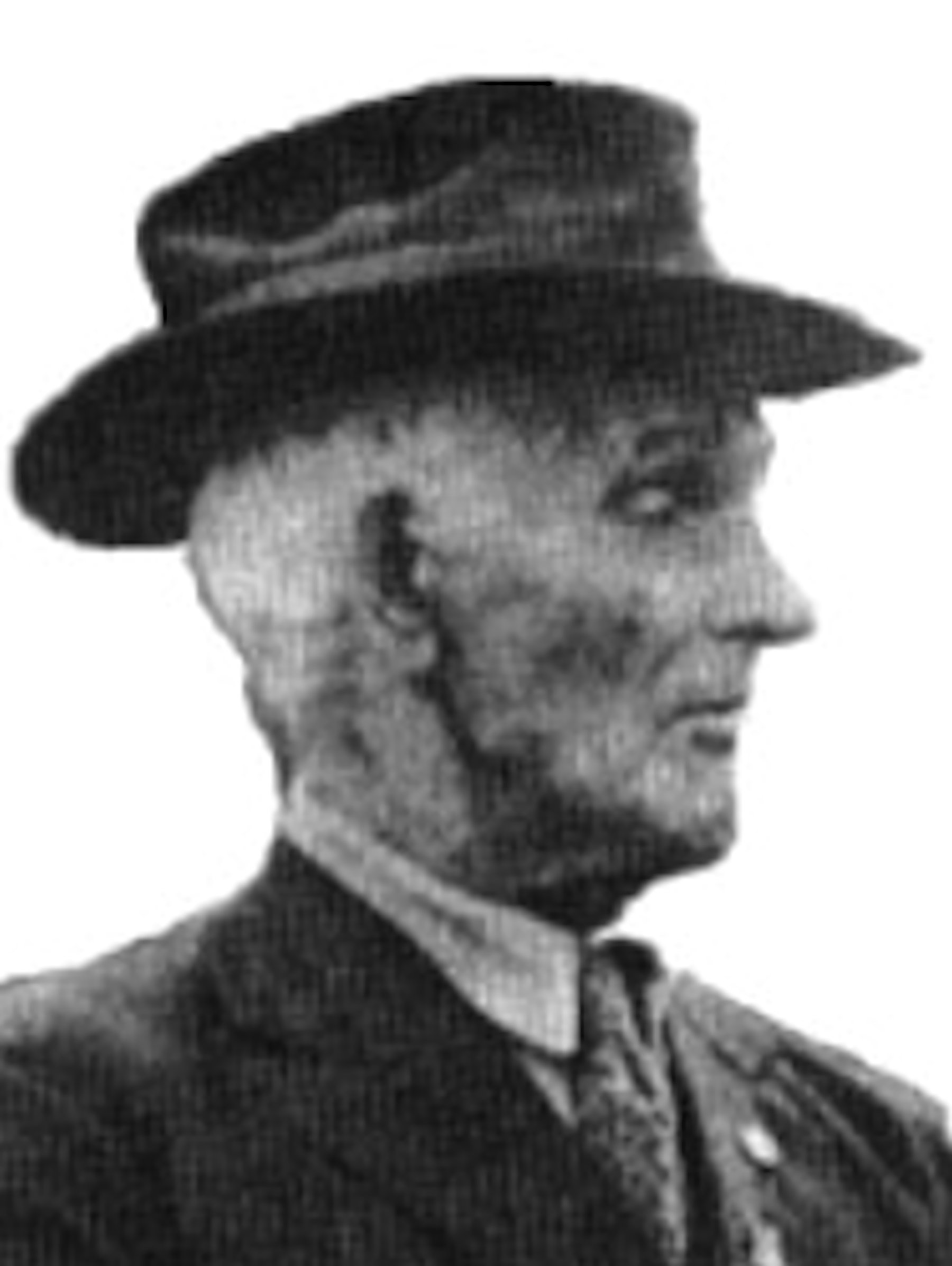
- Born: March 17, 1844; Clayton, New York
- Died: January 22, 1925 (aged 80)
- Military career
- Allegiance: United States of America; Union
- Branch: United States Army; Union Army
- Service years: 1863 - 1865
- Rank: Private
- Units: (New York (state)) Company D, 20th New York Cavalry
- Conflicts: American Civil War
- Awards: Medal of Honor

Joseph Lonsway (March 17, 1844 – January 22, 1925) was a Private in the Union Army and a Medal of Honor recipient for his actions in the American Civil War.

Lonsway enlisted in the Army from Sackett's Harbor, New York in October 1863, and mustered out with his regiment in July 1865.

== Medal of Honor citation ==
Rank and organization: Private, Company D, 20th New York Cavalry. Place and date: At Murfrees Station, Va., October 16, 1864. Entered service at:------. Birth: Clayton, N.Y. Date of issue: Unknown.

Citation:

Volunteered to swim Blackwater River to get a large flat used as a ferry on other side; succeeded in getting the boat safely across, making it possible for a detachment to cross the river and take possession of the enemy's breastworks.

== See also ==
- List of Medal of Honor recipients
- List of American Civil War Medal of Honor recipients: G–L
