= Nancy J. Tarbell =

Professor of Radiation Oncology

Endowed Professor, Dean, Physician Nancy Jane Tarbell
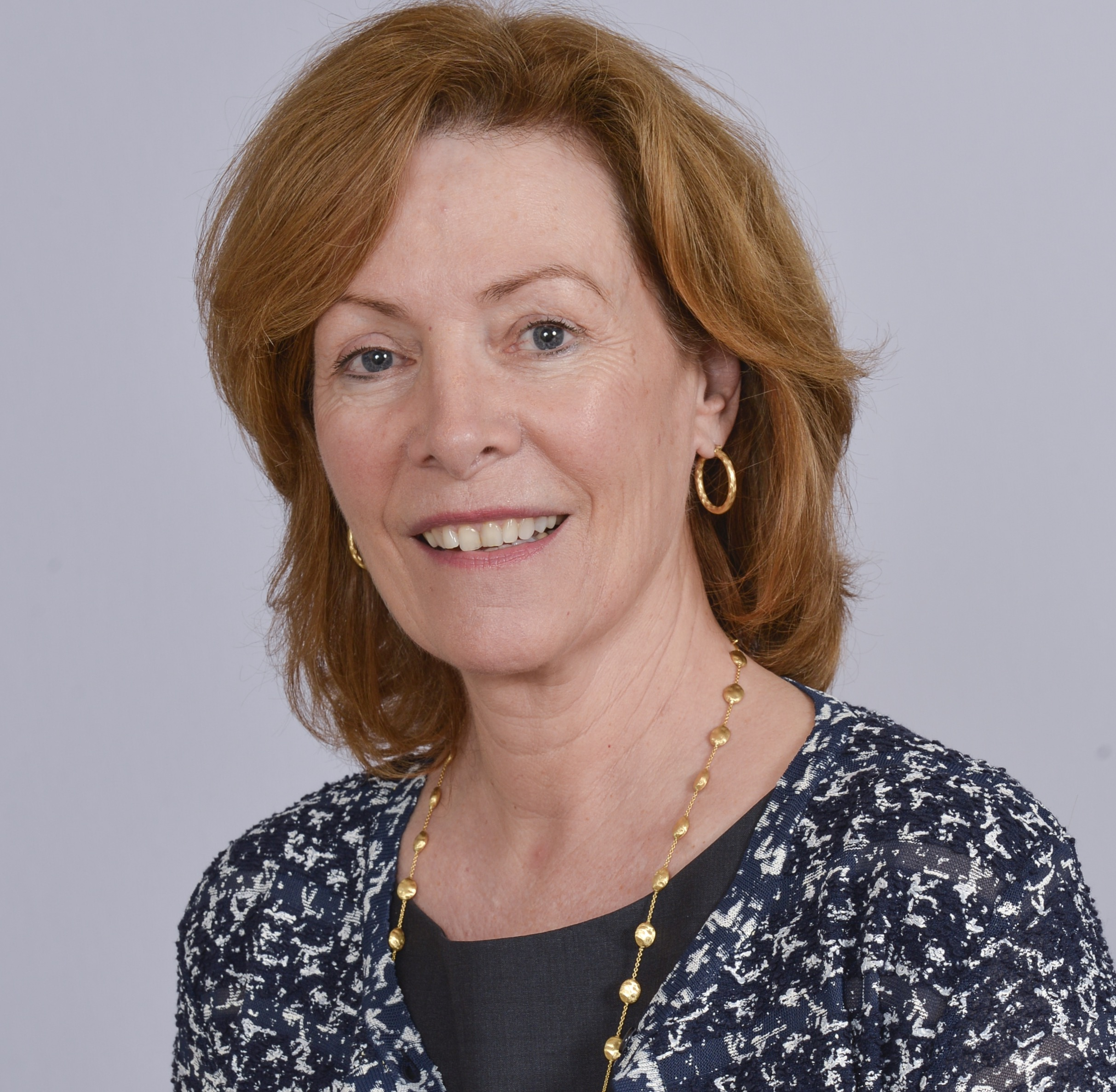
- Born: June 1, 1951 (age 75); Hudson, MA
- Citizenship: United States of America
- Education: University of Rhode Island; SUNY Upstate Medical University (MD)
- Spouse: Jay Steven Loeffler
- Scientific career
- Fields: Radiation oncology, pediatric oncology, proton therapy
- Workplaces: Massachusetts General Hospital, Harvard Medical School

Nancy Jane Tarbell, MD, FASTRO is a distinguished physician and academic leader, renowned for her contributions to pediatric radiation oncology and her leadership at Harvard Medical School. She is the C.C. Wang Professor Emerita of Radiation Oncology at Harvard Medical School and Massachusetts General Hospital. She served as the Dean for Academic and Clinical Affairs at Harvard Medical School from 2008 to 2019 and has been recognized with numerous awards including the ASTRO Gold Medal. American Society of Radiation Oncology (ASTRO) as well as the Margaret Kripke Legend Award from the University of Texas MD Anderson Cancer Center. She was elected to the Institute of Medicine of the National Academies in 2002 (now the National Academy of Medicine). In 2005, she became the C.C. Wang Professor of Radiation Oncology, at Harvard Medical School, an endowed professorship.

== Early life and education ==
Born in Hudson, Massachusetts, she graduated summa cum laude from University of Rhode Island with a major in psychology. She attended SUNY Upstate Medical University for her medical degree. After medical school, she trained at the former Harvard Joint Center for Radiation Therapy (1980-1983) in Boston where she served as Chief Resident.

== Academic and Clinical Career ==
Boston Children's Hospital and Mass General Hospital:

Dr. Tarbell began her career at Boston Children's Hospital where she played a pivotal role in developing the pediatric radiation oncology program. She was the Chief of the Division of Pediatric Radiation Oncology at Boston Children's Hospital from 1984-1997. She then went on to grow the pediatric radiation oncology service at Massachusetts General Hospital from 1997–2008. She is a specialist in pediatric oncology and pediatric brain tumors and served on the national Children’s Oncology Group Brain Tumor Committee.

She was the founding director for the Mass General Office for Women's Career's and the Center for Faculty development, devoted to advancing gender equity in academic medicine.

== Research and Publications ==
Dr. Tarbell is renowned for her research in pediatric brain tumors, particularly high-risk medulloblastoma, and the application of proton therapy. Her scholarly output includes more than 250 original publications and book chapters. Her h-index according to Google Scholar is 89 with 24,652 citations (as of January 31, 2020). She is co-editor of Pediatric Radiation Oncology, now in its 6th edition.
