= Jay Loeffler =

American physician

Dr. Jay Steven Loeffler
- Born: December 27, 1955 (age 70); Carlisle, Pennsylvania
- Spouse: Nancy Jane Tarbell
- Scientific career
- Workplaces: Massachusetts General Hospital, Harvard Medical School

Jay Steven Loeffler (December 27, 1955 – June 22, 2023) was an American physician at Massachusetts General Hospital, where he served as chair of the Department of Radiation Oncology since 2000. He was the Herman and Joan Suit Professor of Radiation Oncology and professor of neurosurgery at Harvard Medical School.

== Education and training ==
Born in Carlisle, Pennsylvania, Loeffler attended The Hill School in Pottstown, Pennsylvania, Williams College, and the Alpert Medical School at Brown University. After medical school, he trained at the former Harvard Joint Center for Radiation Therapy in Boston serving as Chief Resident. He worked in the Laboratory of Radiobiology under John B. Little at the Harvard School of Public Health. He was an attending physician at the Brigham and Women's Hospital and Dana–Farber Cancer Institute specializing in neuro-oncology and was the founding director of the Brain Tumor Center. In 1996, he was recruited to the Massachusetts General Hospital to be the director of the Francis Burr Proton Therapy Center before assuming the role as department chair.

== Research ==
Loeffler has spent his career in the clinical investigation of specialized radiation delivery technologies such as stereotactic radiation and proton therapy. He is an author of over 400 publications, co-editor of nine books and holds funding from the National Cancer Institute in proton therapy. His h-index according to Google Scholar is 101 with 37,323 citations (as of November 11, 2019). His work helped develop the use of stereotactic radiosurgery (SRS), now the mainstay treatment for benign and malignant intracranial tumors. This pivotal research paved the way for the eventual development of stereotactic ablative radiotherapy (SABR), also known as stereotactic body radiation therapy (SBRT), which is now widely used for malignancies throughout the body.

== Awards ==
Loeffler is a Fellow or the American College of Radiology, American Society for Radiation Oncology, and American Association of the Advancement of Science. He is a Member of the National Academy of Medicine. He received the Jacob Fabrikant Award for Lifetime Achievement in the field of stereotactic radiosurgery.
