= Penny Budoff =

American doctor and medical researcher (1939–2008)

Penny Wise Budoff
- Born: July 7, 1939; Albany, New York
- Died: December 6, 2008 (aged 69); Delray Beach, Florida
- Education: Syracuse University (BA); State University of New York Upstate Medical University (MD)
- Occupation: Medical doctor
- Children: Jeffrey Budoff (orthopedic surgeon)

Penny Wise Budoff (July 7, 1939 – December 6, 2008) was an American physician. She was a family practitioner, and a clinical associate professor of family medicine at the State University of New York at Stony Brook. She is known for her research, which established that menstrual cramping is a physical phenomenon rather than a psychological one. She wrote two books on women's health.

== Education and career ==
Budoff attended University of Wisconsin–Madison (1955–57). She received a BA from Syracuse University in 1959 and a medical degree in 1963 from SUNY Upstate Medical University, Syracuse, New York. She was the director of a women's health services center associated with North Shore University Hospital. In 1986, she founded a women's health clinic, the Penny Wise Budoff, MD, Women's Medical Center, which gathered multiple medical specialists focused on care of female patients and was the first of its kind in the United States. Budoff's medical clinic included a center for women undergoing menopause that considered medical issues for women in that portion of their life.

== Research ==
In the 1970s, her work on menstrual cramping (dysmenorrhea) helped to establish that menstrual cramping was physiological rather than psychological. When she started her research into dysmenorrhea in 1974, she found few scientific articles on the topic which led her to begin her own research into the topic. She also studied mefenamic acid as a treatment. When Budoff approached Warner–Lambert, the company manufacturing Ponstel, a commercial version of mefenamic acid, they agreed to supply the drug at no cost for the research but declined to fund the research project. After her initial research showed positive results, they made her an "outside clinical investigator" which allowed a research project with the required controls and placebos that was published in the Journal of the American Medical Association in 1979. The publication of her research was delayed because the research was seen as low priority. She subsequently determined that the presence of prostaglandins cause uterine contractions, and the resulting discomfort could be relieved by zomepirac sodium, research that was published in The New England Journal of Medicine.

She wrote No More Hot Flashes and Other Good News, which was released by Putnam (New York, NY) in 1983, with a revised edition published as No More Hot Flashes and Even More Good News from Warner Books (New York, NY), in 1998.

== Selected publications ==
- Budoff, Penny Wise (June 22, 1979). "Use of Mefenamic Acid in the Treatment of Primary Dysmenorrhea". JAMA: The Journal of the American Medical Association. 241 (25): 2713–2716. doi:10.1001/jama.1979.03290510021018. ISSN 0098-7484. PMID 376875.
- Budoff, Penny Wise (September 16, 1982). "Zomepirac Sodium in the Treatment of Primary Dysmenorrhea Syndrome". New England Journal of Medicine. 307 (12): 714–719. doi:10.1056/NEJM198209163071203. ISSN 0028-4793. PMID 7050711.
- Budoff, P. W. (July 1, 1983). "The use of prostaglandin inhibitors for the premenstrual syndrome". The Journal of Reproductive Medicine. 28 (7): 469–478. ISSN 1943-3565. PMID 6350580.

== Awards ==
- Budoff received recognition awards from the American Medical Association in 1972, 1976 and 1978.
- C. W. Post College named Budoff Woman of the Year in 1981.
- In 1983, the National Consumers League provided special recognition by giving her their Trumpeter Award.

== Death ==
Budoff died in her home on December 6, 2008, in Delray Beach, Florida. She suffered from rheumatoid arthritis from for 20 years and ALS, which resulted in respiratory failure and ultimately her death.
