= Cardiac Electrophysiology Society =

International society

The Cardiac Electrophysiology Society (CES) is an international society of basic and clinical scientists and physicians interested in cardiac electrophysiology and arrhythmias. The Cardiac Electrophysiology Society's founder was George Burch in 1949 and its current president is Jonathan C. Makielski, M.D.
