= Jeffrey Budoff =

American orthopedic surgeon

Dr. Jeffrey Evan Budoff
- Born: 1965
- Education: Harvard College, Cornell University Medical College, University of California, Irvine, California Pacific Medical Center
- Known for: Minimally Invasive Endoscopic Carpal Tunnel Release
- Children: 4
- Scientific career
- Fields: Orthopaedic surgery
- Workplaces: Ben Taub Hospital, Texas Medical Center, Houston Methodist Hospital

Jeffrey Evan Budoff (born 1965) is an American orthopedic surgeon and child of Penny Wise Budoff (Physician, Clinical Associate Professor) . Budoff has written and published 41 articles on health topics and has authored 20 textbook chapters. He has edited five textbooks on the treatment of disorders of the upper extremity (hand, wrist, elbow, and shoulder).

== Teaching career ==
Budoff currently serves as the Clinical Associate Professor of Orthopedic Surgery at the University of Texas Health Science Center at Houston Medical School and also at the Texas Woman’s University (HealthSouth Hand Therapy Fellowship Program).

He has also served as:

- Associate Professor, Department of Orthopedic Surgery, Baylor College of Medicine, Houston, TX from February 3, 2008 to July 31, 2008.
- Assistant Professor, Department of Orthopedic Surgery, Baylor College of Medicine, Houston, TX from September 1, 1999 to February 3, 2008.
- Director, Orthopedic Hand & Upper Extremity Service, Houston Veterans Administration Medical Center from September 1999 to July 2005.
- Clinical Associate Professor of Orthopedic Surgery at the University of Texas Health Science Center at Houston Medical School from November 11, 2009 to present.
- Faculty, Texas Woman's University/HealthSouth Hand Therapy Fellowship Program from 1999 to 2001 and thereafter from 2008 to present.

== Clinical career ==
Budoff has been practicing medicine for 25 years.

He is currently a Clinical Associate Professor of Orthopedic Surgery at the University of Texas, Houston, and he also practices at SouthWest Orthopedics.
