= Günter Breithardt =

German physician, cardiologist and university professor (born 1944)

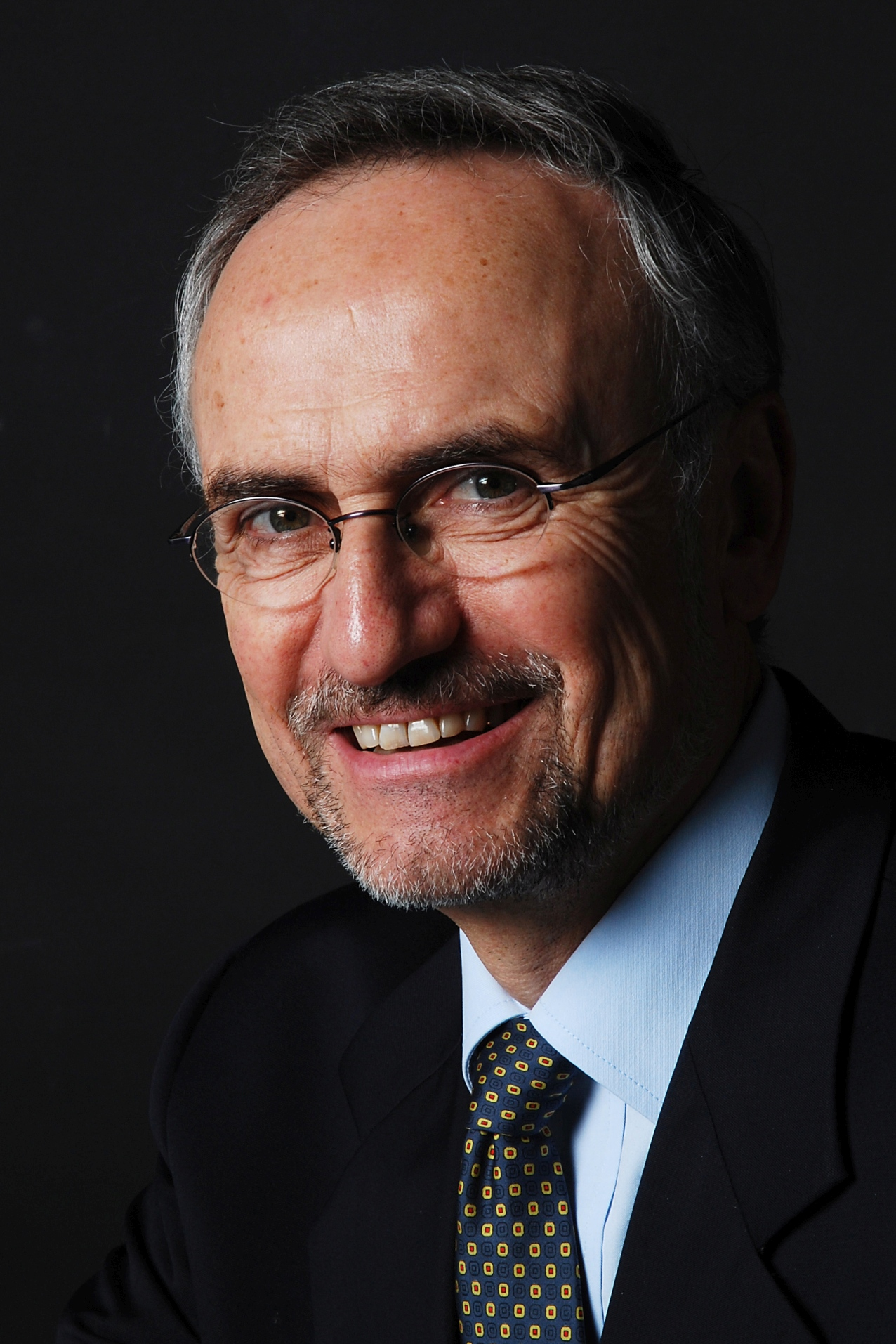
Breithardt in 2009

Günter Breithardt (born 19 January 1944 in Haan/Rhineland) is a German physician, cardiologist and emeritus university professor. He is known for his research in the field of rhythmology, especially the diagnosis and pharmacological and non-pharmacological therapy of cardiac arrhythmias and acute cardiac death, in particular the identification of arrhythmia-triggering gene mutations. For 21 years he headed the Medical Clinic and Polyclinic C (Cardiology, Angiology, Intensive Care Medicine) at Münster University Hospital. A number of his academic students hold university management and chief physician positions.

== Career ==
From 1963 to 1968 he studied human medicine at the universities of Tübingen, Vienna and Düsseldorf. With the thesis "Autohistoradiographic studies on the incorporation of H-3 leucine into hypertrophied heart muscle after swimming training" at the Institute of Pathology at the University of Düsseldorf, Breithardt was awarded his doctorate in 1969. He received his licence to practise medicine in 1970. He did his military service in 1971 as a staff physician at the Institute for Military Medicine and Hygiene in Koblenz. Breithardt is married to a Norwegian woman and has a son and a daughter who - in human and veterinary medicine respectively - also specialise in cardiology.

== Professional life ==
From 1970, Breithardt worked as a research assistant, first at the Institute of Pathology at the University of Düsseldorf under the direction of Hubert Meessen, and from 1971 at the Medical Clinic and Polyclinic under the direction of Franz Loogen. He was recognised as a specialist in internal medicine in 1976 and in cardiology in 1977.
In 1978 Breithardt habilitated with a thesis on "Clinical electrophysiological investigations of sinus node function" and became a senior physician at the Medical Clinic and Polyclinic B of the University of Düsseldorf.
In 1982 he was appointed professor (C3 for a limited period) at the University of Düsseldorf. There he headed the Electrophysiology Laboratory of the Clinic for Cardiology, Angiology and Pneumology. In 1984 he was appointed professor for life (C3).
In 1988 he followed a call to the University of Münster, where he was appointed Professor for Life (C4) and Director of the Medical Clinic and Polyclinic C (Cardiology and Angiology, including Internal Intensive Care Medicine).
In 1991 he also took over as head of the "Coronary Heart Disease" department (later: Molecular Cardiology) at the Leibniz Institute for Arteriosclerosis Research at Münster University.

== Scientific activity ==
Breithardt's research focuses on clinical electrophysiology, arrhythmia diagnostics and therapy, molecular genetics of arrhythmias, mechanisms of heart failure and of arrhythmias and acute cardiac death, mechanisms of re-stenosis as well as arteriosclerosis.

Initially, he conducted electron microscopic and histoautoradiographic studies on organ preservation at the Institute of Pathology of the University of Düsseldorf in collaboration with the Department of Applied and Clinical Pharmacology (Prof. M. Siess) of the Philipps University of Marburg.

After moving to Franz Loogen's clinic towards the end of 1971, Breithardt was increasingly involved, together with his mentor Ludger Seipel, in the developing field of clinical electrophysiology. He became a leader in the study of sinus node function. Breithardt was one of the pioneers of signal-mediated electrocardiography and developed a comprehensive programme of electrophysiological mapping. His group — together with cardiac surgeons — established one of the largest cohorts of patients undergoing surgery for life-threatening ventricular tachycardia.
He has co-edited four editions (1993, 2003, 2009 and 2013) of the standard work Cardiac Mapping for the localisation diagnosis of cardiac arrhythmias.

His pioneering clinical achievements include the world's first catheter ablations of AV conduction and a right-sided accessory pathway with an "incessant" supraventricular reentry tachycardia using radiofrequency current in 1986 in Düsseldorf with the HAT 100 generator developed by Peter Osypka, which allowed a reproducible dose-response curve. He used a catheter with continuous irrigation to prevent clots or overheating of the catheter tip, which later became a standard. The method of ablation using radiofrequency current is now considered standard therapy.
Two years earlier, in 1984, he had already been the first in Germany to use an Implantable cardioverter-defibrillator (ICD) — together with the heart surgeons of the University of Düsseldorf. Five years later, in 1989, it was his research group that was the first in the world to implant a 3rd generation ICD.

Under his leadership, a research programme was initiated at the University of Münster that specifically addressed the mechanisms of arrhythmias and heart failure and included molecular genetics and a variety of animal models from mice to rabbits in vivo and ex vivo.

His research group was involved in the consortium that identified the first gene mutations for Brugada syndrome, described the first mutation responsible for sinus node disease and identified plakophilin-2 as the most common mutation underlying arrhythmogenic right ventricular cardiomyopathy.

Breithardt's involvement in the training and support of young scientists has been noted. He has supported the professional development of early-career physicians in his clinic. More than 20 of his academic students are in university management and chief physician positions.

At the University of Düsseldorf, Breithardt was a member of the DFG Collaborative Research Centre SFB 30 Cardiology and co-founder and deputy spokesperson of the subsequent Collaborative Research Centre 242 "Complications of Coronary Heart Disease", including Sudden Cardiac Death, later in Münster founder and spokesperson of SFB 556 "Heart Failure and Arrhythmias — from the Molecular Basis to the Clinic" (1999-2003), co-founder of the Interdisciplinary Centre for Clinical Research (IZKF) and deputy chairman of the BMBF-funded multicentre CAD-REF Registry to record patients with coronary heart disease (CHD) and chronic kidney disease. Chairman of the BMBF-funded multicentre CAD-REF registry for the registration of patients with coronary heart disease (CHD) and chronic kidney disease.

Breithardt is a founding member and was chairman of the Atrial Fibrillation Competence Network (AFNET), an internationally recognised research platform on atrial fibrillation, from 2003 to 2015. AFNET was funded by the BMBF until 2014 as part of the Competence Networks in Medicine; since then it has been an independent academic research platform, which has been cooperating with the German Centre for Cardiovascular Research (DZHK) since January 2015. Through seven international consensus conferences, AFNET, together with partner EHRA, has contributed to the direction of international research in this field.

Breithardt and his group have acquired third-party funding, the Peter Lancier Endowed Professorship, the Peter Osypka Endowed Professorship, an Endowed Professorship "EMAH" from the Fördergemeinschaft EMAH and a Priority Professorship Molecular Genetics of Myocardial Diseases from the state of NRW, which have enabled the establishment of a multi-unit clinic at Münster University Hospital with independently managed focal areas Cardiology I (incl. intensive care and angiology), II and III, as well as the Institute for Genetics of Heart Diseases and the Cardiac MRI Centre.

== Activity in committees and professional societies ==
In the Deutsche Gesellschaft für Kardiologie (DGK), Breithardt was, among other things. Co-founder - and from 1983 to 1986 chairman - of the working group on arrhythmia diagnostics, member of the commission for clinical cardiology (1985-1997), member of the advisory board of the DGK (1988), co-founder of the Association and later Institute for Clinical Cardiovascular Research (IKKF) (1997–98) as well as Chairman of the Interdisciplinary Task Force on Adults with Congenital Heart Defects (2004-2018), Chairman of the Commission for Scientific Quality (2009-2013) and Chairman of the Task Force on Special Rhythmology (2011-2015). In 1997 he was elected President of the Society (term 1999–2001).

He has contributed to the development of evidence-based guidelines on, among others, on coronary heart disease/angina pectoris (1998), implantation of defibrillators (2000), coronary heart disease and renal failure (2006), interdisciplinary care of adults with congenital heart defects (2006) and treatment of adults with congenital heart defects (2008) as well as a rhythmology curriculum (2012) and a DGK statement on overuse, underuse and misuse (2000).

Under his leadership, the Interdisciplinary Task Force on Adults with Congenital heart defects (EMAH) issued recommendations on the structure of care for this patient group, which is growing in number, as well as guidelines on care and recommendations on additional qualifications for EMAH specialists. The latter recommendations led to the inclusion of EMAH in the Residency training regulations of the German Medical Association.

In the European Society of Cardiology (ESC), Breithardt was Secretary General of the European Congress of Cardiology 1984 in Düsseldorf, Founding Chairman of the Scientific Programme Committee (1986-1990), since 1986 member of the Nucleus of the Working Group on Arrhythmias of the ESC, Founding Chairman of the Research Committee (1990-1992), 1990-2000 member of the Board of the ESC, Councillor-in-Charge of the Working Groups of the ESC (1991-1994), Chair of the Working Group Arrhythmias (1994-1996), founding Chair of the Committee for Clinical and Scientific Initiatives, now Clinical Practice Guidelines (1994-1996), member of the European Affairs Committee (1996-1998), Chair of the ESC Ethics Committee (from 2017) and Chair of the Declaration of Interest (DOI) Committee (2018-2022). In 1994, he became the second German cardiologist to be elected President of the Society (term 1996–1998).

He also chaired the ESC, AHA and American College of Cardiology (ACC) Task Force on "Standards for analysis of ventricular late potentials using high-resolution or signal-averaged electrocardiography" (1987-1990), which was the first ever joint task force of these three major professional societies.

Breithardt was European representative on the executive board of the International Society and Federation of Cardiology (ISFC), now World Heart Federation (WHF), from 1997 to 1998, member of the executive board of the Council on Clinical Cardiology of the WHF (2005-2008), Vice-chair of the Medical Technology Committee of the Health Research Council of the BMBF (1999-2001), Member of the Scientific Committee and Board of Trustees of the Max Delbrück Center Berlin (since 2000), Vice-chairman (2004–2006) and Chairman of the National Registry for Congenital Heart Defects (2007-2009), Spokesman and executive director of the Competence Network for Congenital Heart Defects (2008-2009), Member of the Board of the German Foundation for Heart Research (2008-2016). From 1998 to 2009, Breithardt served as a member of the Leducq Foundation Scientific Advisory Committee. From 2008 to 2013, Breithardt was a member of the international advisory board of CARIM, the cardiovascular research centre of Maastricht University. Since 2009, he has been the European representative to the global initiative to raise awareness of the problems caused by atrial fibrillation (AF AWARE) and a member of the international advisory board of the Interuniversitair Cardiologisch Instituut Nederland (ICIN). From 2011 to 2012, he was a visiting professor of the Royal Netherlands Academy of Arts and Sciences at the Netherlands Heart Institute. Since 2011 he has been a member of the international scientific advisory board of CardioVasculair Onderzoek Nederland (CVON). Since 2005, he has been a member of the scientific advisory board of the German Federal Association for Children with Heart Disease.

Since his retirement, Breithardt has been a member of the board of the "Karla-Völlm-Stiftung zur Förderung des EMAH-Zentrums Universitätsklinik Münster" and is still a Board Reviewer of the European Heart Journal.

Breithardt is a member of the following professional societies:

- German Society for Internal Medicine (DGIM)
- German Society for Internal Intensive Care and Emergency Medicine (DGIIN)
- European Atherosclerosis Society (EAS)
- European Heart Rhythm Association (EHRA)
- American Electrophysiology Society
- North American Society for Pacing and Electrophysiology (NASPE); today Heart RhythmSociety (HRS)
- International Society for Holter and Noninvasive Electrophysiology (ISHNE)

== Honours ==
- In 1978 he received the Edens Prize from the University of Düsseldorf for the paper "Clinical electrophysiological studies of sinus node function."
- In 1988, he received the Arthur Weber Prize of the German Society of Cardiology for his electrophysiological research on cardiac arrhythmias
- In 1998, he received the Gold Medal of the European Society of Cardiology
- In 1998, he received the Award on Cardiac Electrophysiology from the Hellenic Society of Cardiology.
- In 2000, he delivered the British Cardiovascular Society's Ronnie Campbell Lecture "Sudden cardiac death: molecular genetics and repolarisation".
- In 2000, he received the Distinguished Scientist Award of the International Congress Cardiac Pacing and Electrophysiology
- In 2005, he delivered the Philippe Coumel Lecture "The autonomic nervous system and the heart" at the Middle East Cardiopace Meeting.
- In 2006, he received an honorary doctorate from the University of Coimbra
- In 2009, he received the Carl Ludwig Medal of Honour of the DGK.
- In 2013, he received the Outstanding Achievement Award from the European Cardiac Arrhythmia Society (ECAS).
- In 2015, he delivered the European Heart Rhythm Association (EHRA) Einthoven Lecture "Atrial fibrillation - from mechanisms to improved care".
- In 2016, he received the Werner Forßmann Prize of the Cardiology 2000 Foundation of the Ruhr University Bochum for his life's work.
- In 2016, he received the Gertrud Spitz Foundation Science Award from the DSHF and the DGK.
- In 2017, he delivered the Henry N. Neufeld Lecture "Atrial Fibrillation - From Epidemiology to Prevention and Management" at the International Society of Cardiovascular Pharmacology (ISCP).
- In 2021, he received the ESC President´s Award for Exceptional Contributions to the ESC
- In 2023, he is the third recipient of the „Luigi Luciani Electrophysiology Award“ after Pedro Brugada and Michel Haïssaguerre
- In 2024, he received the „AFNET Lecture on Arrhythmias Award“
- In 2024, he was awarded the Federal Cross of Merit (Bundesverdienstkreuz) of Germany for his professional and voluntary commitment

=== Honorary memberships ===
Breithardt is a Fellow of the European Society of Cardiology (ESC), the American College of Cardiology (ACC) and the Heart Rhythm Society (FHRS), as well as a corresponding member of the Portuguese Society of Cardiology, the Chilean Society of Cardiology and Cardiovascular Surgery and the Spanish Society of Cardiology. He is an honorary member of the Slovak Society of Cardiology, the Polish Society of Cardiology (Polskie Towarzystwo Kardiologiczne), the Société Française de Cardiologie (SFC), the Norwegian Society of Cardiology, the Royal Academy of Medicine of Catalonia (Reial Acadèmia de Medicina de Catalunya) and the Atrial Fibrillation Competence Network.

== Publications (selection) ==
- Breithardt G, Seipel L. The effect of premature atrial depolarization on sinus node automaticity in man. Circulation. 1976; 53(6):920-925
- Breithardt G, Seipel L, Abendroth RR, Loogen F. Serial electrophysiological testing of antiarrhythmic drug efficacy in patients with recurrent ventricular tachycardia. Eur Heart J 1980; 1(1):11-24
- Breithardt, R Becker, L Seipel, R Abendroth, J Ostermeyer. Non-invasive detection of late potentials in man—a new marker for ventricular tachycardia. Eur Heart J 1981;2:1-11.
- Breithardt G, et al. Standards for analysis of ventricular late potentials using high-resolution or signal-averaged electrocardiography. Circulation 1991; 83(4):1481-1488
- Cardiac arrhythmias. (Volume 9 of the Handbook of Internal Medicine) Springer Verlag, 5th edition, Berlin 1983 (together with Berndt Lüderitz as editor).
- Modern Cardiac Rhythm Therapy. Thieme, Stuttgart 2003 (together with Wilhelm Haverkamp).
- Diller GP, Breithardt G, Baumgartner H. Congenital heart defects in adults. Dtsch Ärztebl Int 2011; 108(26):452-459
- Cardiac Mapping, edited by Mohammad Shenasa, Martin Borggrefe, Günter Breithardt, 1st and 2nd edition 1993, 2003, Futura Publishing Company, Mount Kisco, New York, 3rd and 4th edition 2009, 2013, Wiley-Blackwell, Chichester, UK.
- Benign cardiac chasing. Deutsche Herzstiftung, Frankfurt 2019 (together with Paulus Kirchhof and Stefan Zellerhoff).
- Kirchhof P, ... Breithardt G. Outcome parameters for trials in atrial fibrillation: executive summary. Eur Heart J. 2007; 28(22):2803-2817
- Fabritz L, ... Breithardt G, et al. Dynamic risk assessment to improve quality of care in patients with atrial fibrillation: the 77th AFNET/EHRA Consensus Conference. EP Europace 2021; 23(3):329-344
- Günter Breithardt. The ESC Ethics Committee. Eur Heart J 2019; 40(28):2284-2286
- Günter Breithardt. Personalised medicine-between hype and hope. Its present role in atrial fibrillation. Rev R Acad Med Catalunya 2019; 34(4):152-161
- Kirchhof P, ... Breithardt G. Early rhythm-control therapy in patients with atrial fibrillation. N Engl J Med 2020; 383(14):1305-1316
- Breithardt G, et al. Management of Cardiac Patients During the COVID-19 Pandemic. J Saudi Heart Assoc 2020; 32(5):24-25

In the Medline database PubMed, Breithardt is named as author or co-author of 978 specialist publications published between 1969 and 2025.
