= Cardiovascular risk screening =

Cardiovascular risk screening refers to the process of assessing an individual's likelihood of developing cardiovascular diseases. The main aim of screening is to identify risk factors early and adopt preventive measures to reduce morbidity and mortality. Early identification of risk factors can lead to timely interventions, such as lifestyle changes, medications, or surgical treatment. This approach helps in reducing the incidence of major cardiovascular events like heart attack and stroke.

== Common risk factors ==
Key risk factors that are evaluated during cardiovascular risk screening include:

- Hypertension
- Hyperlipidemia
- Diabetes
- Obesity
- Smoking
- Physical inactivity
- Unhealthy diet
- Family history of cardiovascular diseases
- Age (Men over 45 and women over 55 are at higher risk)
- Gender (Men are generally at higher risk, though postmenopausal women are also vulnerable)

== Screening methods ==
Cardiovascular risk screening typically involves a combination of clinical assessments, laboratory tests, and lifestyle evaluations. Commonly used methods include:

- Blood Pressure Measurement
- Lipid Profile Test
- Blood Glucose Test
- Body Mass Index (BMI)
- Electrocardiogram (ECG)
- Risk Assessment Tools such as the Framingham Risk Score and QRISK help to evaluate the cardiovascular risk.

== Challenges ==
There are several challenges including:

- Lack of awareness
- Access to healthcare
- Cost
