= Renal angina =

Clinical procedure to classify acute kidney injuries

In nephrology, renal angina is a clinical methodology to risk stratify patients for the development of persistent and severe acute kidney injury (AKI). The composite of risk factors and early signs of injury for AKI, renal angina is used as a clinical adjunct to help optimize the use of novel AKI biomarker testing. The term angina (from Latin 'infection of the throat' and Greek ankhone 'strangling') are utilized in the context of AKI to denote the development of injury and the choking off of kidney function. Unlike angina pectoris, commonly caused due to ischemia of the heart muscle secondary to coronary artery occlusion or vasospasm, renal angina carries no obvious physical symptomatology (i.e., flank tenderness, suprapubic tenderness, pain with voiding or micturition). Renal angina was derived as a conceptual framework to identify evolving AKI. Like acute coronary syndrome which precedes or is a sign of a heart attack, renal angina is used as a herald sign for a kidney attack. Detection of renal angina is performed by calculating the renal angina index.

== Acute kidney injury ==
=== Background ===
Acute kidney injury (AKI) has been extensively associated with worsened morbidity and is an independent risk factor for mortality in adult and pediatric patients. AKI in the developed world occurs most commonly as a secondary injury to numerous disease processes. Sepsis and cardiopulmonary bypass (CPB) are the most oft recognized and reported "causative" injuries leading to AKI. The pathophysiology of AKI can be broadly categorized into four main categories: ischemic injury – manifest by low glomerular blood flow or perfusion pressure to the renal capillary system, hypoxic injury to the renal interstitium, inflammation of the renal tubules, or necrosis and apoptosis of the renal parenchyma. There is increasing recognition that people are not just dying with AKI, but from AKI.

=== Epidemiology ===
The epidemiology of AKI has changed dramatically in the past 20–25 years. Advances made in the treatment of other diseases (e.g., sepsis and bone marrow transplant (BMT)) have placed more patients at risk of nephrotoxic therapies and medication leading to a spike in secondary AKI (mentioned above). Additionally, diagnostic criteria have become more standardized (mentioned below). Discharge coding data from a sample of United States Medicare beneficiaries demonstrated in increase in AKI prevalence from 14.2 to 34.6 AKI cases per 100 patient discharges and increase from 0.5 to 9.9 per 1,000 hospitalized children. In 49,518 patients, 11% had AKI. Two recent cohorts of critically ill children reported a 17.9% incidence in 2106 admissions and 10% of 3396 admissions. Incidence data for AKI is also commonly reported by association to the inciting disease processes or the use of continuous renal replacement therapy (CRRT), otherwise known as continuous dialysis. An estimated 30-50% of all patients with sepsis develop AKI while 20-40% of all patients after CPB develop AKI. Other populations with high incidence of AKI include burn patients, trauma patients, and patients after BMT. Mortality for patients on CRRT exceeds 50% for adults and is 33-50% in children. Unfortunately, no singular therapy for AKI exists and trials of CRRT for AKI, even at varying doses, have proven to be ineffective at reducing AKI associated morbidity or mortality.

=== Diagnosis ===
The diagnosis of AKI encompasses tests of the blood, urine, and imaging of the kidneys. The glomerular filtration rate (GFR) is used as an index of kidney function and the most frequently used diagnostic test to calculate GFR is the serum creatinine level. GFR also factors in urine and plasma solute concentration. Unfortunately, serum creatinine is highly variable depending on age, sex, metabolic state, body composition (muscle mass), and rate of excretion by the kidney itself. The rate of urine production (i.e., urine output) is also interpreted as a marker of kidney function but the definitions of low urine output (oliguria) also vary by age. Urinalysis often provides clues about kidney health – hematuria, tubular casts, and proteinuria have been used as markers of injury. Unfortunately, the multiple ways used by different practitioners to diagnose AKI have made large scale population analysis difficult (Table 1 - Previous Diagnostic Tests for AKI)

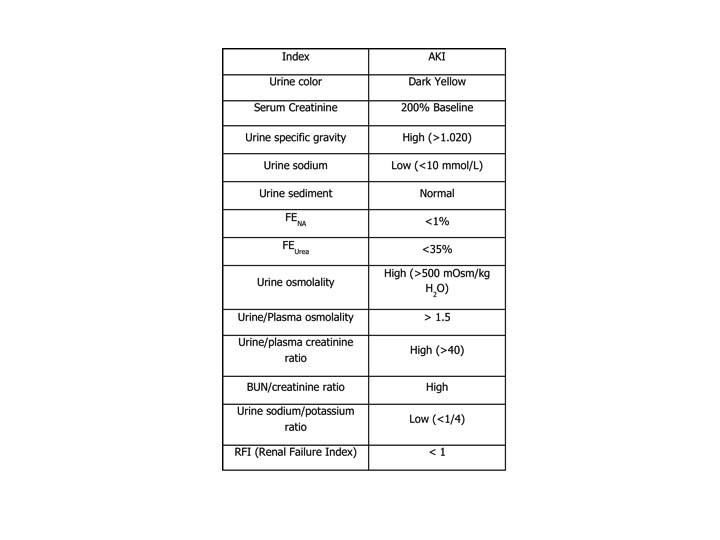
Laboratory evaluations used to diagnose acute kidney injury

=== RIFLE, AKIN, KDIGO ===
In 2004, the Acute Dialysis Quality Initiative group standardized the definition of AKI using the "RIFLE" criteria. Based on GFR, serum creatinine values, and urine output plotted against time of admission, RIFLE, a mnemonic for three levels of severity – Risk, Injury, and Failure, and two outcomes, Loss and End-stage kidney disease, marks progressive degrees of injury in both ICU and non-ICU adult patients. In 2007, the Acute Kidney Injury Network (AKIN) devised strata which defined AKI based on time in relation to absolute creatinine increase, percentage increase, or documented oliguria, broadening the window for time of AKI diagnosis and creating an automatic "failure" designation for any patient placed on renal replacement therapy. In 2007, a pediatric RIFLE (pRIFLE) stratification system was established with weight based – pediatric specific cut-offs for estimated GFR and urine output. Most recently, the Kidney Diseases Improving Global Outcomes (KDIGO) collaborative issued newer severity based AKI stages (Table 2 - Staging Criteria for AKI). Since 2005, numerous studies in both adult and pediatric patient populations have demonstrated that, retrospectively, escalating severity of AKI stratified by these criteria are associated with increased in-hospital morbidity, hospital length of stay, persistence of kidney disease to chronic kidney disease, and mortality.

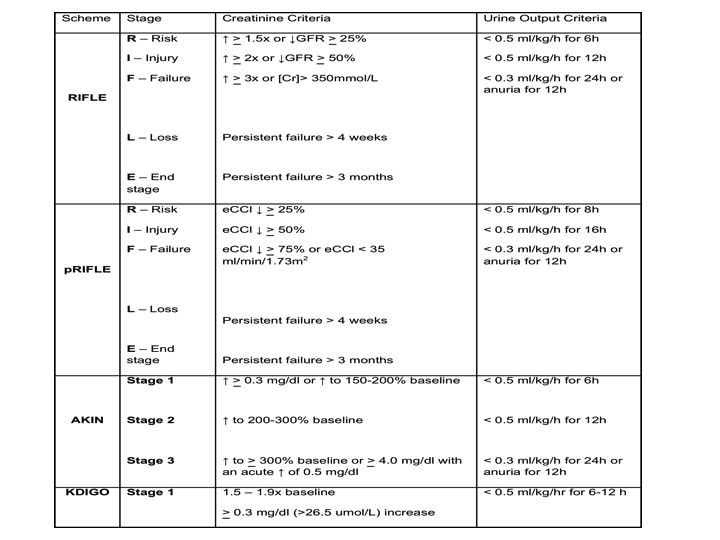
Consensus criteria for diagnosing AKI based on serum creatinine (SCr), creatinine clearance (eCCl), and urine output (UOP) as defined by the RIFLE, pediatric RIFLE (pRIFLE), AKIN, and KDIGO collaboratives.

=== Early diagnosis and new biomarkers ===
AKI researchers have sought novel early, sensitive, and specific biomarkers for AKI. A number of biochemical markers are currently under study for established AKI, early detection of AKI, and prognosis of AKI. The most frequently studied new biomarkers include Cystatin C (CysC), neutrophil gelatinase associated lipocalin (NGAL), interleukin-18, liver-fatty acid binding protein (l-FABP), and kidney injury molecule-1 (KIM-1). Children following cardiopulmonary bypass are often used to derive biomarker performance and validate optimal cut-off values given a known timing and duration of insult, relative homogeneity, and freedom from co-morbidities. Unfortunately, when these and other biomarkers are applied to a more heterogeneous patient population (the general intensive care unit, non-critically ill patients, patients in the emergency department), they demonstrate less robust predictive performance.

== Renal angina ==
=== Renal troponin ===
The inability to detect AKI in the early stages of injury may be a reason for the poor outcomes associated with the disease processes. The quest for the ideal biomarker(s) for early detection of injury has been dubbed "the search for the renal troponin I". An apt analogy to the diagnosis of heart attack, or myocardial infarction, the discovery of serum troponin as a confirmatory biomarker for injury in patients with known risk factors and signs of injury (e.g., pain, chest tightness) revolutionized the survival for acute coronary syndrome (ACS). Without correct context, the performance of troponin for detection of a heart attack is marginal. Renal angina was proposed as an empiric concept to create a threshold of AKI risk to identify patients who would most benefit from a confirmatory AKI biomarker test. Used to predict the development of severe and persistent AKI, defined as RIFLE Stage I or F three days after admission, renal angina is an easy to use, AKI predictive tool. Renal angina manages the heterogeneity of patient populations, directing biomarker testing only for patients who fulfill a combination of illness severity and changes in kidney function. Renal angina can be thought of in terms of a simple equation:

Renal angina threshold = risk of AKI x evidence of AKI

In short, renal angina is a clinical guide that identifies patients at high-risk for AKI by integrating baseline, contextual, and clinical evidence of kidney injury. When criteria for fulfilling renal angina are met, an AKI biomarker (a renal troponin) is optimally used (Figure 1 - Renal Angina Thresholds). As the risk of AKI increases, less evidence of AKI is needed to meet the threshold for renal angina. Conversely, a patient with few risk factors of AKI would require more evidence of AKI in order to achieve the threshold. Once patients fulfill renal angina (e.g. have chest pain for patients with a potential heart attack), the task of the clinician is to 'rule out AKI', using AKI biomarkers and other clinical investigation. Three tranches of risk groups have been proposed.

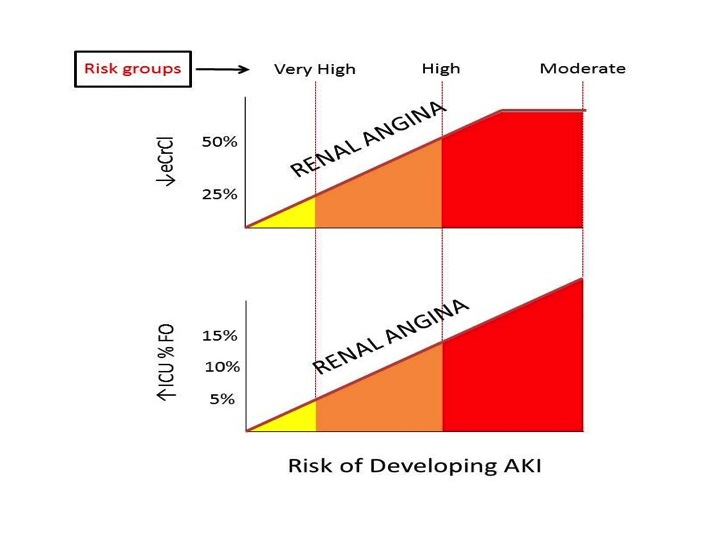
The threshold for fulfilling renal angina depends on risk factors and signs of injury. The greater the risk of AKI, the less injury required to achieve renal angina.

=== Risk factors and injury level ===
The AKI risk factors used for renal angina criteria were derived from population literature of AKI in adults and children. The most common risk factors include sepsis, mechanical ventilation, and the use of inotropic or vasopressor support. Relatively common co-morbid risk factors can also be age specific (e.g. diabetes in adults and bone marrow transplantation (BMT) in children. Early signs of kidney injury used for renal angina derivation are based on changes in serum creatinine and degree of fluid overload(FO). Small changes in serum creatinine have been demonstrated to be associated with a high rate of progression to severe AKI and associated with worsened in-hospital morbidity. Fluid overload (FO) is calculated as:

FO = [(Fluid IN – Fluid OUT (L)) / (Admit weight in kilograms)] * 100

=== Renal angina index ===
Discerning fulfillment of renal angina in children is done by calculating the renal angina index (RAI). The RAI was created to operationalize the renal angina construct. The logic behind the equation dictates that as a patient achieves higher risk they require less "clinical sign of AKI" early on to fulfill renal angina. Similarly, if a patient has less risk but shows more overt signs of clinical AKI signs, renal angina would also be fulfilled. Per the epidemiology of AKI, the risk of AKI increases in multiplicative fashion with increased risk factors. The incidence of AKI demonstrates fold-increases (5 to 10 to 50%) for higher risk patients. This same increase is seen retrospectively in the case of fluid overload. Risk of mortality in patients with AKI demonstrates similar fold-increases for increasing AKI severity. Thus, the creation of the renal angina index was done by a multiplicative index (instead of sum). The RAI score is a composite of risk strata and clinical signs. Risk strata were given point values that were essentially the epidemiologic risk compared to general pediatric risk divided by 10: 5 (very high risk), 3 (high risk), and 1 (moderate risk). Clinical signs of injury are based on changes in estimated creatinine clearance (eCCl) or % fluid overload (% FO). The assigned point values are: 1 (ICU status and no decrease in eCCl or <5% FO), 2 (> 5% FO or eCCl decrease of 0-25%), 4 (>10% FO or eCCl decrease of 25-50%), or 8 (>15% FO or eCCl decrease of > 50%). The composite range of the RAI is therefore: 1, 2, 3, 4, 5, 6, 8, 10, 12, 20, 24, and 40. Patients who fulfill features of both the risk stratification and the associated threshold for clinical signs of kidney dysfunction are akin to the cardiac angina paradigm to guide troponin assessment. For instance, troponin would not be expected to function well for prediction of myocardial ischemia in an otherwise healthy 25-year-old that experienced chest pain after eating a fatty meal. Likewise, a troponin should not be drawn on every 85-year-old seen in an emergency room irrespective of the presence of chest pain just because myocardial infarctions are more prevalent in older individuals.

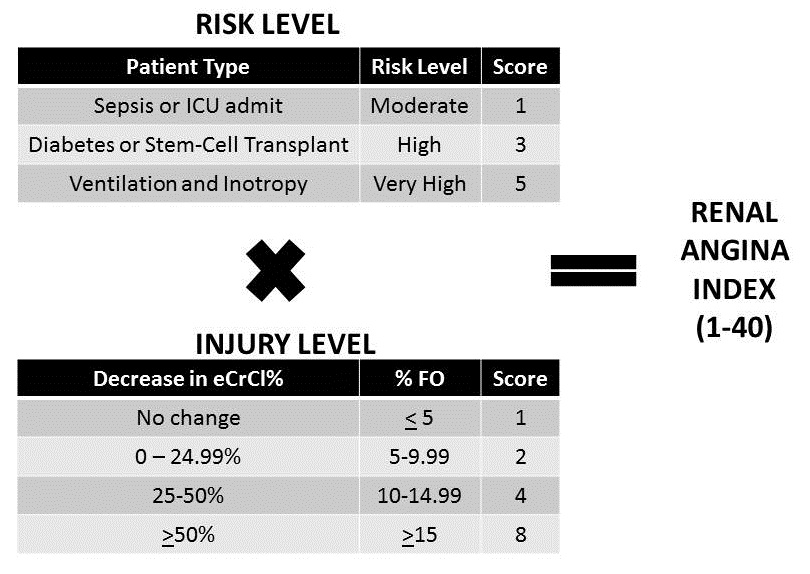
Fulfillment of renal angina is determined by calculating the renal angina index. A value of > or = 8 is interpreted as positive for renal angina.

=== Biomarker incorporation ===
As mentioned earlier, novel AKI biomarkers have not demonstrated consistent predictive performance outside of the neonatal cardiac surgery (CPB) population. After assessment for optimal sensitivity and specificity (Youden's J statistic), the renal angina index level derived as positive for renal angina fulfillment is greater than or equal to 8. A positive biomarker result in the population with an RAI > or = 8 significantly increases the predictive discrimination for subsequent severe AKI. Judicious AKI biomarker assessment will increase their predictive performance and clinical effectiveness. AKI biomarkers need to demonstrate the appropriate balance of diagnostic performance and cost-effectiveness in order to gain widespread acceptance leading to implementation at the bedside. Indiscriminate biomarker measurement in every patient, regardless of size, age, and co-morbidities, for a given injury or syndrome will render any test virtually useless. Renal angina index assessment is early (day of admission), easy to practice (calculating RAI and measuring biomarkers is relatively simple compared to calculation of severity of illness scores), useful (high negative predictive value), and could potentially change initial resuscitation targets (fluid goals), use of medications (nephrotoxins), and timing of adjunctive therapies (renal replacement therapy).

== Renal angina studies ==
=== Derivation and validation ===
The fulfillment of renal angina, using the renal angina index, has demonstrated a high negative predictive value for subsequent severe AKI. In the initial derivation and validation study, the RAI demonstrated a NPV of 92-99% in four separate pediatric patient populations for Day 3 – AKI. In that study, the RAI outperformed standard illness severity scores such as Pediatric Risk of Mortality (PRISM) for prediction of AKI severity. Additionally, the RAI outperformed the prediction afforded by AKI risk factors or signs of injury alone. Adult studies of renal angina syndrome and predictive "sub-acute AKI" have also been published.

=== Biomarker incorporation ===
The incorporation of biomarkers into renal angina positive patients improves predictive performance for subsequent severe AKI. In the initial study of the RAI incorporating AKI biomarkers, a positive biomarker result (using matrix metalloproteinase-8, neutrophil elastase-2, or NGAL) in the population with an RAI > or = 8 significantly increased the predictive discrimination of renal angina for subsequent severe AKI. Improvement of AKI prediction by incorporation of biomarkers into the renal angina index occurred via correct classification of disease, improving the Akaike Information Criterion (AIC), demonstrating net reclassification improvement (NRI), and integrated discrimination improvement (IDI). The results demonstrate that a clinician can identify the absence or fulfillment of renal angina in any patient on admission and then appropriately allocate the use of an AKI biomarker test to those in whom the test may yield the greatest predictive benefit. The excellent negative predictive value (NPV > 90%) of the RAI allows a clinician to reliably 'rule out' AKI outside the window of 'functional AKI' and may afford more freedom of management for the acutely ill patient (i.e., higher volume resuscitation) with less concerns about developing the severe fluid overload consistently associated with poor outcomes in critically ill patients.
