= Franz Loogen =

German cardiologist (1919–2010)

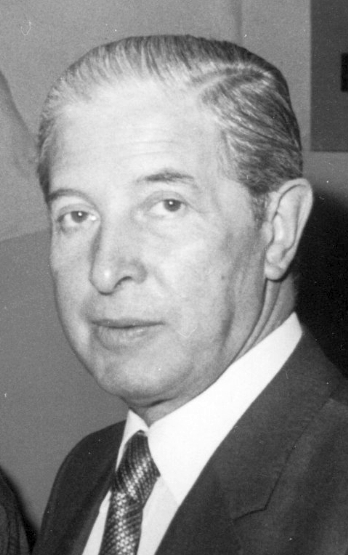
Loogen in 1984

Franz Loogen (13 April 1919 – 3 September 2010) was a German cardiologist. He was a contributor to the popularization of cardiac catheterization and the independent specialty of internal medicine in Germany. He held the first cardiology chair outside paediatrics in Germany and founded the "Düsseldorf School of Cardiology". He also worked for the Germany national football team at the 1954 World Cup as team doctor.

== Career ==
Franz Loogen was born in Baesweiler near Aachen as the son of the administrative official Melchior Loogen and his wife Maria. After graduating from the Kaiser-Karls-Gymnasium in Aachen in 1937, Loogen studied human medicine in Cologne, where he took his medical examination in 1939. For the 1st clinical semester he transferred to the Friedrich Wilhelm University of Berlin, as the University of Cologne had been closed at the beginning of the war. He was able to complete the second clinical semester in Cologne again. Loogen was then drafted into military service with the Gebirgsjäger in Füssen. After frontline medical service in France and Russia (1940–1942), he joined a student company. A leave of absence to finish his medical studies at the Ludwig-Maximilians-Universität München saved his life, as his unit was destroyed near Leningrad shortly after his return from Russia. At the Ludwig-Maximilians-Universität München, Loogen continued his studies from the summer semester of 1942 and passed the state examination in medicine on 13 July 1944, as well as receiving his doctorate with the thesis "Über den sog. ärztlichen Kunstfehler" (On the so-called medical malpractice) from the surgeon Karl Vossschulte (1907-2001). He then had to return to military service and spent three months as a hospital doctor in Rosenheim.

In September 1944, while on home leave, Loogen was taken first as an American and then as a British prisoner of war, from which he was not released until January 1948. In British captivity he played in an English soccer team and worked as a camp doctor in the prisoner-of-war camp in Horbling. During this time, he met an English doctor of German origin who (then illegally) provided him with penicilline as early as 1946, with which Loogen was able to successfully treat fellow prisoners suffering from endocarditis.

Loogen had been married to Hedwig, née Tillis († 2009) since 1943. The marriage produced one daughter.

== Professional life ==
After his release from captivity, Loogen initially worked from 1948 as an unpaid volunteer assistant doctor with Erich Boden at the 1st Medical Clinic of the Düsseldorf Medical Academy, the forerunner of the University of Düsseldorf, which was founded in 1965. There he met Otto Bayer, with whom he performed the first cardiac catheter examinations in 1948/49, and became a member of the cardiology working group headed by Bayer at the 1st Medical Clinic. In the course of 1949 he became ward physician and scientific assistant. His first scientific field of work was endocarditis.
1952: Loogen sets up a cardiology outpatient clinic in the Medical Clinic. The number of patients increases steadily.
1954: Publication of the first German monograph on cardiac catheterization, dedicated to the later Nobel Prize winner Werner Forßmann, which became the "bible" of every interventional cardiologist.
1955: Franz Grosse-Brockhoff, director of the 1st Medical Clinic, officially appoints Loogen to head the cardiology working group.
1957: Habilitation under Grosse-Brockhoff with the thesis "Pulmonary hypertension in congenital heart defects with high current volume (ductus arteriosus apertus, ventricular septal defect, atrial septal defect)".
1959: Senior physician at the 1st Medical Clinic.
1960: Joins the then "German Society for Cardiovascular Research" (DGK), today: Deutsche Gesellschaft für Kardiologie (German Society for Cardiology - Cardiovascular Research).
1963: Appointment as adjunct professor.
1965: Appointed associate professor. Loogen takes over the newly created extraordinary - and in the Federal Republic of Germany first - chair for "Internal Medicine, especially Cardiology" in Düsseldorf. In the same year, the University of Düsseldorf is founded from the former Düsseldorf Medical Academy.
1966: Head of the Department of Cardiology at the 1st Medical Clinic.
1967: the associate professorship is converted into a full professorship and Loogen is appointed full professor.
1968 to 1985: Chairman of the Collaborative Research Centre "Cardiology" (SFB 30) of the German Research Foundation at the University of Düsseldorf.
1969 to 1993: Editor of the Journal of Cardiovascular Research.
1969 to 1972: Editor - together with Konrad Spang, Stuttgart - of the Archiv für Kreislaufforschung.
1969: The former tuberculosis ward is converted into the new Department of Cardiology of the 1st Medical Clinic of the University of Düsseldorf.
1971: Call (primo et unico loco) to the Chair of Cardiology at the University of Heidelberg. During the negotiations to remain in Düsseldorf, Loogen achieves an increase in the number of cardiology beds to 90.
1972: 1st Medical Clinic of the University of Düsseldorf is subdivided and Loogen is appointed head of the new Clinic B. In the same year he is awarded the specialist title of internal medicine with a sub-specialty in cardiology.
1972: Elected to the Board of the European Society of Cardiology.
1975: Elected Chairman of the German Society for Cardiovascular Research and Conference President of the DGK Annual Conference in Bad Nauheim.
1976: Appointed Medical Director of the Medical Institutions of the University of Düsseldorf.
1980 to 1984: President of the European Society of Cardiology (ESC) and President of the ESC Congress 1984 in Düsseldorf.
1986: Retirement
1988 to 1997: Medical activity in the cardiac catheter department at the St.Vincenz Hospital in Essen.

== Academic work and merits ==
Loogen is considered the doyen of clinical cardiology in Germany. Once his interest in heart disease was aroused - apparently by the endocarditis cases in the prisoner-of-war camp - and he was able to participate in invasive cardiological diagnostics with the cardiac catheter in Otto Bayer's group at the beginning of his residency, he devoted himself entirely to cardiology.

His scientific work initially focused on acquired valvular heart defects and all congenital heart defects. Later, coronary heart disease, cardiomyopathies and electrotherapy (pacemakers) were added.

Loogen recognised early on that progress and the increase in knowledge no longer allowed cardiac medicine to be practised alongside general internal medicine. He therefore persistently campaigned for the independence of cardiology as an independent specialty in Germany, despite opposition from internists, who accused him of destroying the unity of internal medicine through this specialisation. Loogen himself described this as a "process of detachment with many tensions and frustrations". In the end, this even led to a break with his then clinic director Grosse-Brockhoff. Loogen, who nevertheless always saw cardiology in the context of internal medicine, experienced a late "reconciliatory" recognition when he was awarded honorary membership of the German Society for Internal Medicine in 1998.

Loogen established the first independent department of cardiology and collaborated early on with the (Düsseldorf) cardiac surgeons, especially Ernst Derra and Wolfgang Bircks. It was only after he was awarded the first cardiology chair with a clinical department in 1967 that "cardiology" became a fixed term in Germany and doctors practising cardiology were referred to as "cardiologists."

In addition, Loogen also successfully represented German cardiology at specialist congresses abroad in order to overcome the ostracism of Germany after the Second World War, to restore its professional recognition and to integrate it into the international cardiology community. As early as 1972, he was the first German to be elected to the board of the European Society of Cardiology (ESC). In 1980, Loogen took office as ESC president (1980–84) at the European Congress of Cardiology. 16 years later, his student Günter Breithardt succeeded him in this post.

During his time as president of the ESC, Loogen also represented the interests of European countries on the board of the International Society and Federation of Cardiology (ISFC), which later became the World Heart Federation. With a sure instinct for world politics, he won the agreement of representatives of the then Eastern Bloc countries and in particular the Soviet Society of Cardiology - long before the fall of the Berlin Wall - to hold the XII World Congress of Cardiology, organised by the ISFC, in (West) Berlin in 1994. As he was keen to enable cardiologists from Eastern Bloc countries to participate, it was agreed that the Eastern Bloc cardiologists - due to a lack of foreign currency - could stay overnight in East Berlin and cross the border daily for the congress. Due to the changes in world politics in 1989, the XII. World Congress was then held together with the annual ESC Congress in 1994, when the Iron Curtain disappeared.

In addition to his office as President of the ESC, Loogen was also President of the 1984 ESC Congress in Düsseldorf, which was not only the first European cardiology congress in Germany, but was also so successful, with almost 10,000 participants, that it provided the impetus for the ESC Congress to be held annually from 1988 onwards and has developed into the world's largest specialist cardiology congress.

As a university teacher, Loogen supervised numerous doctoral students and 15 post-doctoral students. His "school" produced several generations of medical specialists, a number of chief physicians and numerous full professors at other universities.

When at the beginning of the 1970s a split between "theoreticians" and clinicians threatened in the German Society for Circulatory Research, long dominated by basic researchers, as a result of the rapid development of clinical cardiology, Loogen averted this, according to the assessment of the long-time DGK executive director Gunther Arnold, by introducing - in addition to the traditional (basic) scientific annual meeting in Bad Nauheim (today in Mannheim) - the clinically oriented autumn meeting, at which "only clinicians should have their say and no fundamental questions should be discussed". In addition, as early as 1971 he campaigned - together with HansBlömer - for the establishment of the "Commission for Clinical Cardiology" of the DGK, of which he became the first chairman.

During his editorship, Loogen worked to ensure that the Zeitschrift für Kardiologie continued to appear in German - contrary to the prevailing trend among other medical journals - so as not to exclude doctors interested in cardiology in East Germany, who were less familiar with English at the time, from the readership.

== Commitment in football ==
During his time as a student at the Ludwig-Maximilians-Universität München from 1942 to 1944, Loogen was active as a football player for Bayern Munich as a left halfback. During this period he played a total of ten point games in the Gauliga Südbayern and scored two goals. In the Gau-Pokal matches, the winners of which qualified for the final round of the Tschammerpokal, he played in a total of three games, whereby in his last, on 18 June 1944, in a 4–3 victory over FC Wacker München, he exceptionally played as a centre forward and became the match winner with the goals for 2–1, 3–1 and 4–3.

In order to earn a living for his family while working as an unpaid assistant doctor (doctor in training) after returning from captivity, Loogen became a contract player for Fortuna Düsseldorf in 1948, for which he received a salary of 250 Deutsche Mark a month. Between 1948 and 1950 he played 22 games in the then Oberliga West. After his active footballing days, he worked as team doctor for Fortuna Düsseldorf from 1952 to 1956. During this time he was also the contract doctor for the city of Düsseldorf for sport (with consultation hours in the Düsseldorf ice stadium) and from 1951 to 1955 he was head of the sports medical advice centre of the city of Düsseldorf.

In 1954, he was hired by national coach Sepp Herberger as the team doctor for the Germany national football team at the World Cup in Bern, replacing a doctor from Frankfurt who had dropped out at short notice. When allegations arose in the early 2000s that the hepatitis illness that occurred in a large part of the winning team shortly after the World Cup match was connected to banned doping, Loogen testified in a television programme in 2004 that the players had only received vitamin C injections. He conceded that the pathogen could have been transmitted from one already infected player to the others during the injection, especially since there were no disposable syringes in 1954 and the hepatitis virus, about which little was known at the time, can survive ordinary sterilization.

From 1961 to 1962 Loogen was president of Fortuna Düsseldorf, later chairman of the advisory board.

== Honours ==
- In 1973, he received the Ernst von Bergmann Medal for his services to continuing medical education.
- In 1984, he was awarded the Gold Medal of the European Society of Cardiology
- In 1986, he was honoured with the Cross of Merit 1st Class of Germany
- In 1997 he received an honorary doctorate from the Medical Faculty of the University of Essen.
- In 1998 he received the Carl Ludwig Medal of Honour of the DGK.
- In 1998, he became an honorary member of the German Society of Internal Medicine.
- In 2003 he received the Forßmann Prize for his life work.

The Franz Loogen Prize and the Franz Loogen Foundation are named after him.

== Publications (selection) ==
- Der Herzkatheterismus bei angeborenen und erworbenen Herzfehlern (Cardiac catheterisation in congenital and acquired heart defects). Thieme, Stuttgart 1954 (together with Otto Bayer and Hans Helmut Wolter).
- Der pulmonale Hochdruck bei angeborenen Herzfehlern mit hohem Stromvolumen (Ductus arteriosus apertus, Ventrikelseptumdefekt, Vorhofseptumdefekt) (Pulmonary hypertension in congenital heart defects with high current volume (ductus arteriosus apertus, ventricular septal defect, atrial septal defect)). 1958. (Habilitation thesis)
- Angeborene Herz- und Gefässfehler (Congenital heart and vascular defects). In: Röntgendiagnostik des Herzens und der Gefässe. Handbuch der Medizinischen Radiologie. Springer, Berlin 1967 (together with R. Rippert and Jakob Schoenmackers).
- Erworbene Herzklappenfehler (Acquired valvular heart defects). In: Röntgendiagnostik des Herzens und der Gefässe. Handbuch der Medizinischen Radiologie. Springer, Berlin 1977 (together with L. Seipel, U. Gleichmann, H. Vieten).
- Die Kardiomyopathien (The cardiomyopathies). In: Röntgendiagnostik des Herzens und der Gefässe. Handbuch der Medizinischen Radiologie. Springer, Berlin 1977 (together with H. Kuhn, G. Breithardt, L. Seipel, W. Krelhaus).
- Gefässerkrankungen. (Vascular Diseases). Witzstrock, Baden-Baden 1974 (as editor with K. Credner).

In the Medline database PubMed, Loogen is listed as author or co-author of 361 publications published between 1951 and 1993.

== Literature ==
- Günter Breithardt, Ludger Seipel: Laudatio anlässlich des 90. Geburtstages von Professor Dr. med. Dr. h. c. Franz Loogen. In: Clinical Research in Cardiology. Bd. 98 (2009), p. 341–343, doi:10.1007/s00392-009-0030-4.
