= Reclassification =

Reclassification is the changing of an object or concept from one classification to another. This may refer to:

- Reclassification (accounting)
- Reclassification (education), changing a student's high school (secondary school) graduation class
- U.S. reclassification program
- Cannabis (reclassification)
- Net reclassification improvement
