= Thomas Eschenhagen =

German pharmacologist

- Born: September 19, 1960 (age 66); Göttingen, West Germany
- Education: Hannover Medical School
- Known for: Engineered heart tissue
- Awards: Member of the German National Academy of Sciences Leopoldina (2008); Member of the Academia Europaea (2017)
- Scientific career
- Fields: Pharmacology, tissue engineering
- Workplaces: University Medical Center Hamburg-Eppendorf
- Academic advisors: Hasso Scholz

Thomas Eschenhagen (born 19 September 1960) is a German pharmacologist and physician. He is director of the Institute of Experimental Pharmacology and Toxicology at the University Medical Center Hamburg-Eppendorf. In 1997 he and his colleagues developed engineered heart tissue (EHT), a beating three-dimensional heart muscle construct, which was grown from heart cells. Later, his group used the method for drug screening and for growing heart tissue from human induced pluripotent stem cells. The group has also transplanted EHT patches onto injured hearts in animal studies.

Eschenhagen was spokesperson of the German Centre for Cardiovascular Research from 2011 to 2020 and president of the International Society for Heart Research from 2019 to 2022. He is a member of the German National Academy of Sciences Leopoldina and the Academia Europaea, and in 2025 he received the Peter Harris Distinguished Scientist Award of the International Society for Heart Research.

== Biography ==
Eschenhagen was born on 19 September 1960 in Göttingen. He studied medicine at Hannover Medical School from 1978 to 1986 and received his doctorate there in 1988. He trained as a pharmacologist under Hasso Scholz at the University Medical Center Hamburg-Eppendorf and studied molecular biology at the University of Hamburg. He completed his habilitation in 1994 and then held a Heisenberg fellowship from the German Research Foundation (DFG). He moved to the University of Erlangen-Nuremberg in 1999 as chair of the Institute of Clinical Pharmacology and Toxicology, and returned to Hamburg in 2002 to head the Institute of Experimental Pharmacology and Toxicology at the University Medical Center Hamburg-Eppendorf.

From 2010 to 2012 Eschenhagen was president of the European Section of the International Society for Heart Research. In 2011 he became spokesperson of the German Centre for Cardiovascular Research (DZHK), a post he held until 2020. He was president of the 84th annual meeting of the German Cardiac Society in 2018 and of the International Society for Heart Research from 2019 to 2022.

== Research ==
In 1994 Eschenhagen developed a technique for producing three-dimensional artificial heart tissue, in collaboration with Elliot Elson's group at Washington University in St. Louis. He and his group published the method three years later. In this method, they mixed embryonic chick heart cells with collagen to form a beating three-dimensional construct, known as engineered heart tissue (EHT).

His group in Hamburg then made EHT from rat heart cells and stretched it in a device that simulated the heart's contractions. When implanted into rats, the stretched tissue contracted up to four times more strongly than unstretched tissue. With Wolfram-Hubertus Zimmermann, the group developed ring-shaped tissues whose force after mechanical conditioning approached that of native heart muscle. In 2006 the group reported that stacked rings of this tissue, implanted in rats after a myocardial infarction, coupled electrically with the heart and improved its function.Later Eschenhagen and his group developed a technique for making a series of fibrin-based EHTs and measuring their contractions automatically. In 2010 the group tested the system with drugs that cause arrhythmias or heart damage, and the results supported its use for drug screening. Eschenhagen, Arne Hansen and two colleagues shared the DFG's Ursula M. Händel Animal Welfare Prize in 2011 for work to reduce the use of animal experiments in studying the effects of drugs on the human heart. The group also used stiffer silicone posts to make the tissue contract against a greater load, as a model of pathological cardiac hypertrophy. In 2015 Eschenhagen co-founded the company EHT Technologies. Dinaqor acquired it in 2021 and later turned it into Dinabios. Eschenhagen is a member of the Dinabios board.

Eschenhagen and Hansen's group used induced pluripotent stem cells to grow heart muscle tissue from a patient's skin or blood sample. In 2013 he received a European Research Council advanced grant. With Lucie Carrier he studied the heart muscle disease hypertrophic cardiomyopathy. Their work showed that a deficiency of cardiac myosin-binding protein C, a protein often affected in the disease, impairs relaxation of the heart muscle.In 2016 the group led by Eschenhagen and Florian Weinberger transplanted EHT patches onto injured hearts of guinea pigs. The patches were made from heart cells derived from human induced pluripotent stem cells. These patches rebuilt part of the damaged muscle and coupled electrically with the host heart. A 2021 study by the group found that the benefit increased with the number of heart muscle cells transplanted. In that study the group also transplanted human-scale patches of 5 by 7 centimetres onto pig hearts to test surgical feasibility.

== Awards and honors ==
- 1992 - Rudolf Thauer Award, German Cardiac Society
- 1995 - Sandoz Award for Translational Science
- 1997 - Albert Fraenkel Prize, German Cardiac Society
- 2004 - Elected member, Göttingen Academy of Sciences and Humanities
- 2008 - Elected member, German National Academy of Sciences Leopoldina
- 2011 - Ursula M. Händel Animal Welfare Prize, German Research Foundation
- 2012 - Outstanding Investigator Award, International Society for Heart Research
- 2016 - President's Distinguished Lecture Award, International Society for Heart Research
- 2017 - Elected member, Academia Europaea
- 2025 - Peter Harris Distinguished Scientist Award, International Society for Heart Research

== Selected publications ==
- Eschenhagen, T.; Mende, U.; Nose, M.; et al. (1992). "Increased messenger RNA level of the inhibitory G protein alpha subunit Gi alpha-2 in human end-stage heart failure". Circulation Research. 70 (4): 688–696. doi:10.1161/01.RES.70.4.688. PMID 1551195.
- Eschenhagen, Thomas; Fink, Christine; Remmers, Ute; et al. (1997). "Three-dimensional reconstitution of embryonic cardiomyocytes in a collagen matrix: a new heart muscle model system". The FASEB Journal. 11 (8): 683–694. doi:10.1096/fasebj.11.8.9240969. PMID 9240969.
