= Trimerelysin II =

Identifiers
- EC no.: 3.4.24.53
- CAS no.: 151125-15-4

Databases
- IntEnz: IntEnz view
- BRENDA: BRENDA entry
- ExPASy: NiceZyme view
- KEGG: KEGG entry
- MetaCyc: metabolic pathway
- PRIAM: profile
- PDB structures: RCSB PDB PDBe PDBsum
Search
- PMC: articles
- PubMed: articles
- NCBI: proteins

Trimerelysin II (EC 3.4.24.53, Trimeresurus metalloendopeptidase II, proteinase H2, H2-proteinase) is an enzyme. This enzyme catalyses the following chemical reaction

Cleavage of Asn^{3}-Gln, His^{10}-Leu and Ala^{14}-Leu in the insulin B chain, and the bond Z-Gly-Pro-Leu-Gly-Pro in a small molecule substrate of microbial collagenase

This endopeptidase is present in the venom of the habu snake (Trimeresurus flavoviridis).
