= Communication services sector reshuffle =

Reorganization of the S&P 500 Index services centre

The communication services sector reshuffle is a reorganisation of the S&P 500 Index services centre in the United States. It took place on September 21, 2018.

== "De-FAANGing" of the Technology Sector ==
After the close of the market on Friday, September 21, 2018, the technology sectors of the S&P 500 Index and the Global Industry Classification Standard (GICS) underwent a huge change, that reshuffled the sector in which certain telecommunication and information technology companies would be placed. "FAANG" is an acronym representing the tech giants Facebook, Apple, Amazon, Netflix and Google. Therefore "de-FAANGing" is a unique reshuffling of these companies to properly fit them into new sectors, because they have been the companies that have helped the U.S. Stock Market considerably in these past five years. The overlap of these companies caused certain sectors to gain too much weight in the S&P 500 and this reshuffling promised a boost in trading volume for all companies involved and affected by the new sector change. This new sector, known as Communication Services, includes some major information technology companies such as Facebook and Google's parent company, Alphabet, as well as large Consumer Discretionary companies, such as Netflix and Comcast. As well as these two shifts, a complete move for the Telecommunication Services sector into the new Communication Services sector also occurred. This new sector is important because it recognizes how media, telecommunications and different Internet companies assimilate regardless of their overall differences in the services they provided. The MSCI plans to follow a similar reshuffling throughout October and into November to match this reshuffling of the S&P 500 and GICS. This Communication Services sector is a revamping of a smaller sector, Telecommunications Services, that included Verizon and AT&T. However, it will now include at least eighteen companies from the Information Technology and Consumer Discretionary sectors, along with a slight name change. Lastly, this reshuffling is so important because it is the second time since 1999 a sector has been added to stock indices.

=== The Reason Behind the "De-FAANGing" ===
When the S&P 500 and GICS announced this major tech reshuffling in 2018, it was met with much controversy and questioning from those concerned about dividend yields and protection of their investments. They responded by saying: "(Reclassification) is a step towards acknowledging the convergence of telecommunications, media, and select internet companies and the overlapping services rendered by these companies, within the Global Industry Classification Standard Structure."

Essentially, they believed that these IT companies, as well as different telecommunication, media and Internet companies, had all grown so large that they deserved a unique sector. This new sector enabled them to keep the weight of the tech sector from expanding too much, as well as to recognize the similarities in services among one another. The information technology sector is one of the biggest sectors on the S&P Dow Jones Indices. Seven of the larger information technology companies make up about a fifth of the information technology sector of the S&P 500 Index. These were moved to the Communication Services sector because of the large growth of the Information Technology sector, taking up nearly a quarter of the total weight of the [S&P 500 Index. As well as this sector being reshuffled, sixteen companies taking up nearly twenty-two percent of the Consumer Discretionary sector were moved to the Communication Services sector. This was in order to increase the companies involved in each sector as all of the IT and consumer discretionary companies gained significance on the U.S. Stock Market. Also, the tech sector had its first fall in over a month from February to March 2018. Overall, this new sector takes up about ten percent of the S&P 500, including twenty-three major companies and having a market capital of about $2.8 Trillion.

== Results ==
=== Effects per Sector ===
This sector reclassification was created to boost the volume of transactions in the S&P 500 by twenty billion dollars in shares. Each sector was affected in different ways due to certain powerhouse companies leaving the sector, causing the significance of other companies in that sector to rise. Overall, more than 26 companies in three different sectors were affected by this reshuffling into the new Communication Services sector. First, the Telecommunications Services sector, which only takes up two percent of the S&P 500 Indices, basically dissipated and the companies in this sector, such as Verizon, AT&T and CenturyLink moved into the larger Communications Services sector. Next, thirteen companies from the Consumer Discretionary Sector such as CBS, Disney, Netflix, Comcast and 21st Century Fox moved into the Communications Services sector. The weight of this sector on the S&P 500 decreased from about thirteen percent to nearly ten percent. On top of these changes, the Information Technology sector suffered the biggest decrease in weight on the S&P 500 due to the shift of powerhouse companies into this new Communications Services sector. With the departure of the giant tech companies Facebook and Alphabet, the Information Technology sector lost about five percent of its weight on the S&P 500, decreasing from over twenty-six percent to about twenty-one percent.

=== Effects per Company ===
With so many enormous, influential companies involved in this reshuffling, many other companies were affected that were not even involved in it. Most companies that were not involved however impacted by this reshuffle, increased in significance in their own business due to higher weighted companies shifting out of that sector. For example, in the Information Technology sector, with the move out by Facebook as well as Alphabet and Twitter, Microsoft was able to increase its weight in the sector by three percent moving from thirteen to nearly sixteen, benefiting those Investors with shares in Microsoft. Microsoft also increased their weight from this reshuffle due to the move of eBay from the Information Technology sector into the Consumer Discretionary sector. Another example is the increase in Amazon's weight in the Consumer Discretionary sector from twenty-six percent to nearly a third after the move of major companies such as Netflix, Disney and CBS into the new sector. As to the effects of companies in the Telecommunications Services sector, many stockholders were not very pleased with this shift. What made this sector so appealing is that they had a high w:dividend yield, and more defensive qualities to protect investors from suffering higher losses from drops in the stock market. The shift from telecommunications services to communications services caused a decrease in dividend yield for companies from about five and a half percent to barely more than a percent.

== US Equity Volume Soars ==
=== Effect on U.S. Stock Market ===
Due to the strength and weight of the companies involved in the reshuffling, the US Stock market trading volume skyrocketed on Friday, September 21, 2018. On that day about eleven billion shares were in movement between all the companies involved with and affected by the reshuffling, the largest trading day since February 2018. Both companies involved in and affected by the reshuffling saw increases in trading volume, especially the bigger companies involved. For example, Facebook, Alphabet, and Netflix all saw increases in the volume of transactions in their shares due to increased pressure to sell, which was most likely the cause of the larger sector funds moving towards smaller ones. Although the S&P 500 ended relatively flat on Friday, Facebook and Alphabet fell nearly two per cent. The week end for the S&P 500 showed a month's high of positive 0.8 per cent, led by none other than the technology stocks, which have continuously brought the S&P 500 out of a recession. These numbers are fairly good considering over a month earlier Facebook had the biggest single-day fall of any company in U.S. history, on top of an increase in the fear of an international w:Trade war in the United States with China and an increase in U.S. w:Interest rates. Taking all of this into account, the fact that trade volume was positive with a fear of an international trade war signifies just how strong investors felt about this reshuffling because people usually fear buying and selling stocks even in the tech industry when an international trade war is imminent. Lastly, this S&P 500 sector reshuffling is the largest of its kind in the GICS since its institution in 1999.

=== Other Impacts - Exchange-traded funds ===
The effects of the reshuffling of these tech giants into the new Communication Services sector do not stop at direct companies and sectors. They have a larger impact on the overall market because so many of these companies being relocated have a steep potential for growth in Exchange-traded funds (ETF) while increasing exchange traded products. An ETF is a marketable security that tracks a stock market index, a commodity, a bond, or a basket of assets. A large portion of these ETFs are created to track specific stock indices and their sectors’ activity but do not actually follow stock of a certain company. Because the Global Industry Classification Standard decided to commit to this reshuffling, they forced many large investment management firms and others providing ETFs to sell huge amounts of their investors shares in the information technology and consumer discretionary sectors as well as telecommunications sector due to the move of large companies out of these sectors. An example of this occurred with the State Street Global Advisors, a strong investment management firm with ETFs representing the communications services, consumer discretion and information technology sectors of the S&P 500. They created an ETF for the new communication services sector June 19, 2018. It already has $252 million in assets. They also plan to rebalance their consumer discretionary and information tech ETFs by selling assets of their already profitable communications services ETF and allocate them to the info tech and consumer discretionary ETFs. This occurred due to the sale of millions of shares of Alphabet and Facebook because of their move out of the Information Technology sector. On the other hand, the SSGA did not have to sell its shares in the telecommunications sector because although it did not have specific ETFs tracking this sector, management still chose to, because certain companies in this sector could be affected in their various tech sector ETFs. On top of SSGA, other investment companies such as Vanguard followed by putting limits on their involvement in ETFs that track the MSCI. They did this over fears of the increased strength and mostly overlapping in this new sector between telecommunications, media, and Internet companies, while the telecommunications sector diminished from a mere three companies. These concerns come about because they leave the telecommunications vulnerable for huge changes in its constituents as well as this new sector having too many companies providing similar services, thus possibly lowering trading volume. The results have not yet shown this lowering of trade volume. Overall trade volume is supposed to increase even larger than the already 10.9 billion shares traded the Friday before this policy was enacted.
