= Salvatore Novo =

Italian author, researcher

Salvatore Novo is an Italian author, professor and researcher in the field of cardiovascular disease, epidemiology and risk factors of atherosclerosis. He has authored about 550 papers. He is one of the highly cited authors in the field of cardiovascular diseases.

== Education ==
Salvatore Novo was graduated with honors in Medicine from the University of Palermo in 1972 and post-graduated in Cardiovascular Diseases & Internal Medicine at the University of Palermo, and also post-graduated in Medical Angiology from University of Catania.

Novo previously worked as an Associate Professor of Clinical Pathophysiology in University of Catania and Palermo. Then, he became a full Professor of CV Diseases at the University of Palermo.

== Research and career ==
During his service in the University of Palermo and University Hospital "Paolo Giaccone" of Palermo, he was Director of the chair and post-graduate School of CVD, II level Master of Echocardiography and Vascular Diseases, and teaching of CVD several post-graduate Schools of the School of Medicine and Director of the Division of Clinical Cardiology with Haemodynamics, Electrophysiology and stimulation as well as Rehabilitation.

== Awards and honors ==
- Fellow of the European Society of Cardiology (FESC), since 2004.
- Honorary Member of the Czech Society of Angiology - Purkinje Academy (2005)
- Fellow of the American College of Cardiology (FACC), since 2012.
- Honorary member of the Italian Association of Cardio-Oncology (since 2012).

== Publications ==
- 2016 European Guidelines on cardiovascular disease prevention in clinical practice.
- Electrocardiographic abnormalities, preclinical carotid atherosclerosis andcardiovascular risk, in an apparently healthy real-world population: data from the project "No Stroke, No Infarction" of the rotary international - District 2110 "Sicily & Malta".
- Markers of inflammation and infection influence the outcome of patients with baseline asymptomatic carotid lesions: a 5-year follow-up study.
- Moderate alcohol use and health: a consensus document.
- Critical limb ischemia: definition and natural history.
- Cardiovascular risk assessment beyond systemic coronary risk estimation: a role for organ damage markers.
- Classification, epidemiology, risk factors, and natural history of peripheral arterial disease.
- Carotid atherosclerosis and chronic hepatitis C: a prospective study of risk associations.
