= Ioanna Tzoulaki =

Greek epidemiologist

- Education: University of Edinburgh; National and Kapodistrian University of Athens
- Scientific career
- Workplaces: Imperial College London; University of Ioannina
- Thesis: Inflammation and haemostasis in the development and progression of peripheral atherosclerotic disease. (2007)

Ioanna Tzoulaki is a professor of Chronic Disease Epidemiology at Imperial College London. She investigates prognostic risk factors and models for chronic diseases and meta-epidemiology. In 2019 she received a Greek L'ORÉAL-UNESCO Award for Women in Science.

== Early life and education ==
Her father was a mathematician. At the University of Edinburgh she studied inflammation and haemostasis in peripheral atherosclerotic disease. She made use of the Edinburgh Artery Study, a cohort study of over 1,500 men and women.

== Research and career ==
Tzoulaki looks to understand what predisposes certain people to chronic diseases. The diseases investigate by Tzoulaki include cardiovascular disease, Alzheimer's disease and Dementia. By developing prognostic risk models, Tzoulaki believes it should be possible to identify who might be at risk of certain conditions and advise of preventative methods early. She showed that people with elevated iron levels are at higher risk of suffering from a cardioembolic stroke, a condition which is caused by blood clots which move from the heart to the brain and block the supply of blood and oxygen. To investigate this connection, Tzoulaki used a method known as Mendelian randomization.

Tzoulaki identified that people who are very overweight are almost a third more likely to suffer from coronary artery disease than those with a healthy body weight, even if their blood pressure and blood sugar are healthy. In an attempt to predict people's risk of heart disease, Tzoulaki developed sophisticated testing protocols that analysed genetic variants. These tests looked for single-nucleotide polymorphisms, small changes in DNA that occur when one nucleotide is replaced with another. She found that these protocols only showed a modest benefit over conventional testing (i.e. calculating QRISK; which evaluates levels of cholesterol, smoking habits and history of diabetes).

In 2019 she received a Greek L'ORÉAL-UNESCO Award for Women in Science for her work in "Research on Cardiovascular Risk Factors". In September 2020 Tzoulaki was made Professor of Chronic Disease Epidemiology at Imperial College London.

== Selected publications ==
- Georg B Ehret; Patricia B Munroe; Kenneth M Rice; et al. (6 October 2011). "Genetic variants in novel pathways influence blood pressure and cardiovascular disease risk". Nature. 478 (7367): 103–9. doi:10.1038/nature10405. ISSN 1476-4687. PMC 3340926. PMID 21909115. Wikidata Q24630394.
- Evropi Theodoratou; Ioanna Tzoulaki; Lina Zgaga; John P A Ioannidis (2014). "Vitamin D and multiple health outcomes: umbrella review of systematic reviews and meta-analyses of observational studies and randomised trials". The BMJ. 348 (apr01 2) g2035. doi:10.1136/bmj.g2035. ISSN 0959-8138. PMC 3972415. PMID 24690624. Wikidata Q22306552.
- Ian J Brown; Ioanna Tzoulaki; Vanessa Candeias; Paul Elliott (7 April 2009). "Salt intakes around the world: implications for public health". International Journal of Epidemiology. 38 (3): 791–813. doi:10.1093/ije/dyp139. ISSN 0300-5771. PMID 19351697. Wikidata Q37436726.

== Personal life ==
Tzoulaki has children.
