= HeartScore =

Cardiovascular disease risk assessment

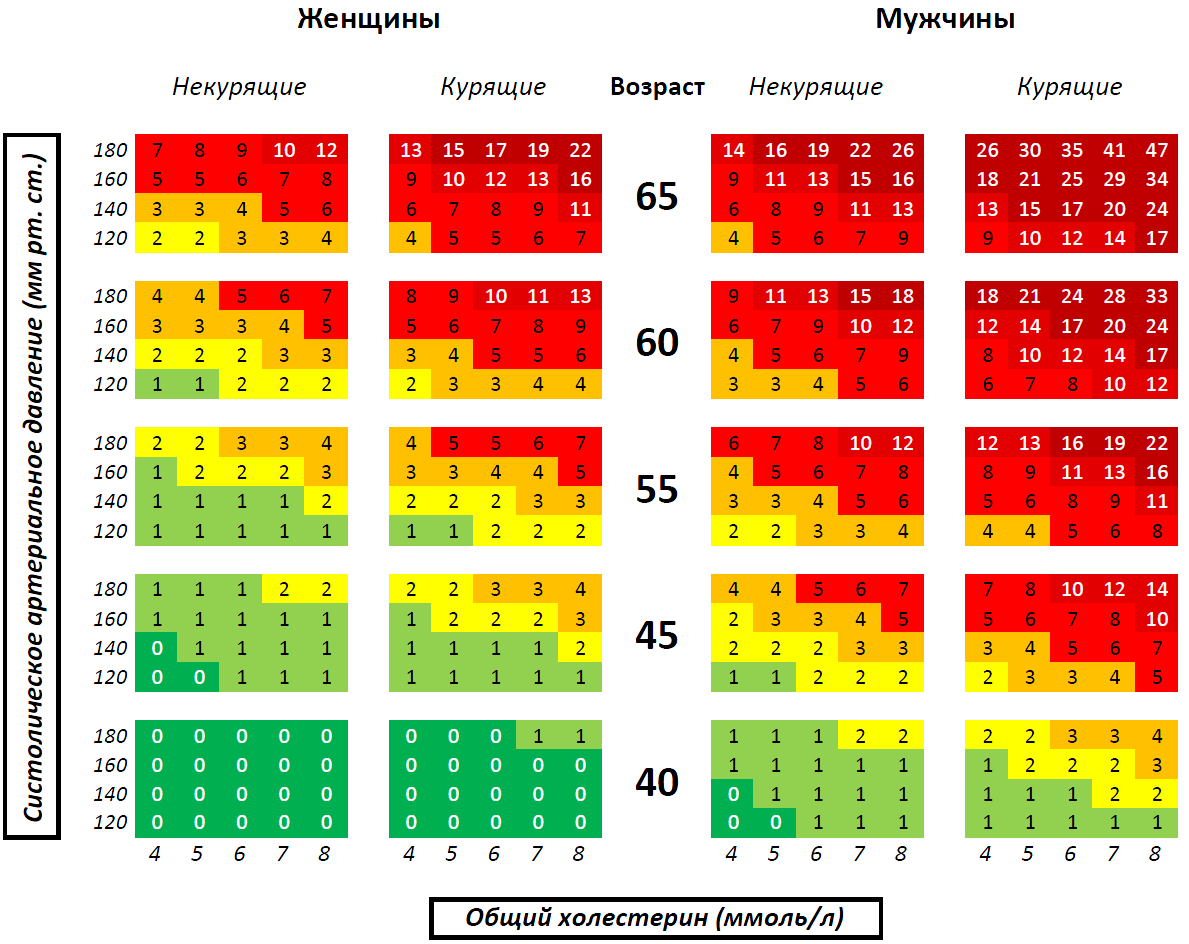
SCORE table of the risk of death from cardiovascular disease over 10 years for high-risk European countries.

HeartScore is a cardiovascular disease risk assessment and management tool developed by the European Society of Cardiology, aimed at supporting clinicians in optimising individual cardiovascular risk reduction.

== Scientific Background ==
HeartScore is the interactive version of SCORE - Systematic COronary Risk Evaluation - a cardiovascular disease risk assessment system initiated by the European Society of Cardiology, using data from 12 European cohort studies (N=205,178) covering a wide geographic spread of countries at different levels of cardiovascular risks. The SCORE data contains some 3-million person-years of observation and 7,934 fatal cardiovascular events.

The SCORE risk estimation is based on the following risk factors: gender, age, smoking, systolic blood pressure, total cholesterol, and estimates fatal cardiovascular disease events over a ten-year period.

HeartScore is one of the tools developed to implement the 2007 European guidelines on CVD prevention in clinical practice.

== Features ==
- Patient history and progress management
- Patient list management
- Graphical display: absolute CVD risk
- Graphical display: risk factors contribution to total risk
- Intervention area: European guidelines on CVD Prevention in clinical practice
- Printable patient advice

== Available versions ==
In addition to two European versions for high/low risk countries, HeartScore now counts 13 national versions. HeartScore Sweden was the first national version to be launched in 2005, followed by versions in Germany, Greece, Poland, Spain, Cyprus, Slovakia, Czech Republic and Turkey. Translated versions now exist in Bosnia and Herzegovina, Russia, Romania and Croatia.

A roll-out plan of additional national versions has been defined for 2009–2010 within the framework of the EuroHeart Programme of the European Commission and according to countries specific requests. Further updates will be produced as knowledge evolves (new cohort studies, risk factors, end points)

== Available formats ==
Three formats have been developed to cater for different users’ needs:

- a web-based version, offering graphical display of absolute CVD risk, including relative risk for younger patients, patient data history and progress monitoring
- a downloadable PC version is available since 2008
- a quick calculator

== See also ==
- Framingham Risk Score
- QRISK
- Coronary artery disease
- Framingham Coronary Heart Disease Risk Score
