= Arthur E. Weber =

German specialist of Heart disease

Arthur Ernst Weber
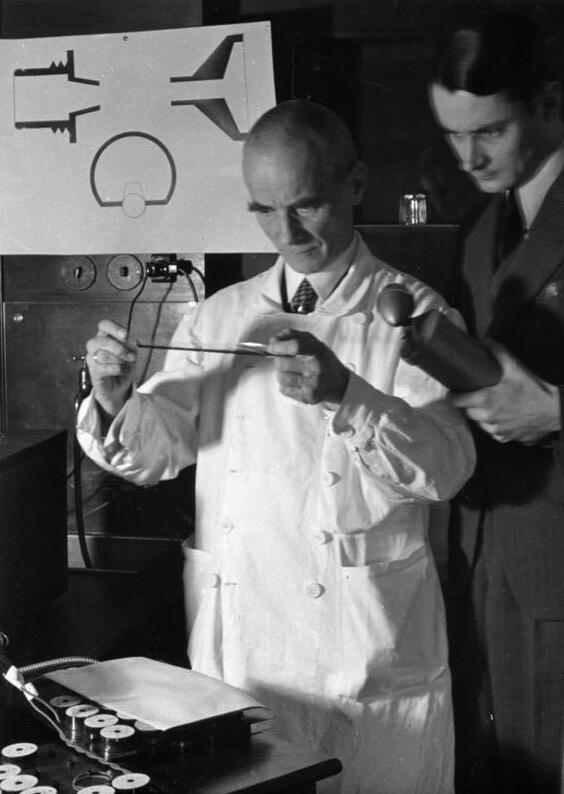
- Born: 3 August 1879; Fechenheim, Kingdom of Prussia, German Empire
- Died: 7 June 1975 (aged 94); Eschwege, West Germany
- Medical career
- Profession: Doctor
- Field: Cardiology

Arthur Ernst Weber (3 August 1879 in Fechenheim, Germany – 7 June 1975) was a German medical doctor who studied electrocardiography, reentrant tachycardia, phonocardiography, radiography and their uses in diagnosing heart diseases. He published several papers in the 1920s and 1930s on the subject.

== German Society for Circulation Research ==
Professor Arthur Weber and Professor Bruno Kisch formed the German Society for Circulation Research on 3 June 1927, "to bring forward circulation research in Germany"; this organization was later to become the German Cardiac Society.

== Arthur Weber Prize ==
The Arthur Weber Prize Arthur Weber-Preis awarded by the German Cardiac Society as recognition of his accomplishments in the field.
