= ABCD² score =

Score for determining the risk of stroke after TIA

ABCD^{2} score
- MDCalc

The ABCD^{2} score is a clinical prediction rule used to determine the risk for stroke in the days following a transient ischemic attack (TIA, a condition in which temporary brain dysfunction results from oxygen shortage in the brain). Its usefulness was questioned in a 2015 review as it was not found to separate those who are at low from those who are at high risk of future problems. A high score correctly predicted 87% of the people who did have a stroke in the following 7 days but also many people who did not have problems.

The ABCD^{2} score is based on five parameters (age, blood pressure, clinical features, duration of TIA, and presence of diabetes); scores for each item are added together to produce an overall result ranging between zero and seven. People found to have a high score are often sent to a specialist sooner. Other clinical risk factors, such as atrial fibrillation and anticoagulation treatment, as well as ongoing or recurrent TIA, are also relevant.

The ABCD^{2} score was proposed in 2007 as a modified version of the ABCD score of 2005 (the ABCD score did not consider the presence of diabetes). In the largest study based on emergency department testing of the ABCD^{2} score in an acute setting, the score performed poorly in both high-risk and low-risk patients. The study found the score to be 31.6% sensitive in high-risk patients (score >5) and only 12.5% specific in low-risk patients (score ≤2).

== Scoring system ==
ABCD^{2} score
	Age	Blood Pressure	Clinical Features	Duration of TIA	Diabetes
no point	<60 years	normal	no speech disturbance and no unilateral (one-sided) weakness	<10 minutes	no diabetes
1 point	≥60 years	raised (≥140/90 mmHg)	speech disturbance present but no unilateral weakness	10–59 minutes	diabetes present
2 points	–	–	unilateral weakness	≥60 minutes	–

- For example, a person aged 60 (1 point) with normal blood pressure (0 point) and without diabetes (0 point) who experienced a TIA lasting 10 minutes (1 point) with a speech disturbance but no weakness on one side of the body (1 point) would score a total of 3 points.

== Interpretation ==
The risk for stroke can be estimated from the ABCD^{2} score as follows:

- Score 1-3 (low)
  - 2 day risk = 1.0%
  - 7 day risk = 1.2%
- Score 4-5 (moderate)
  - 2 day risk = 4.1%
  - 7 day risk = 5.9%
- Score 6–7 (high)
  - 2 day risk = 8.1%
  - 7 day risk = 11.7%
