= ESC Congress =

Annual congress of the European Society of Cardiology (ESC)

The ESC Congress is the annual congress of the European Society of Cardiology (ESC), the largest medical congress in Europe. It gathers over 30,000 active participants (mainly cardiologists) and takes place every year in August/September in a different European city.

== List of ESC Congresses ==
The first ESC Congress was held in 1950 and from then on every 4 years until 1988, when it became an annual event.

- 1984 – (Germany) Düsseldorf
- 1988 – (Austria) Vienna
- 1989 – (France) Nice
- 1990 – (Sweden) Stockholm
- 1991 – (Netherlands) Amsterdam
- 1992 – (Spain) Barcelona
- 1993 – (France) Nice
- 1994 – (Germany) Berlin
- 1995 – (Netherlands) Amsterdam
- 1996 – (United Kingdom) Birmingham
- 1997 – (Sweden) Stockholm
- 1998 – (Austria) Vienna
- 1999 – (Spain) Barcelona
- 2000 – (Netherlands) Amsterdam
- 2001 – (Sweden) Stockholm
- 2002 – (Germany) Berlin
- 2003 – (Austria) Vienna
- 2004 – (Germany) Munich
- 2005 – (Sweden) Stockholm
- 2006 – (Spain) Barcelona
- 2007 – (Austria) Vienna
- 2008 – (Germany) Munich
- 2009 – (Spain) Barcelona
- 2010 – (Sweden) Stockholm
- 2011 – (France) Paris
- 2012 – (Germany) Munich
- 2013 – (Netherlands) Amsterdam
- 2014 – (Spain) Barcelona
- 2015 – (United Kingdom) London
- 2016 – (Italy) Rome
- 2017 – (Spain) Barcelona
- 2018 – (Germany) Munich
- 2019 – (France) Paris
- 2020 – (Netherlands) Amsterdam (Online only)
- 2021 – (United Kingdom) London (Online only)
- 2022 – (Spain) Barcelona (On-site and Online)
- 2023 – (Netherlands) Amsterdam (On-site and Online)
- 2024 – (United Kingdom) London
- 2025 – (Spain) Madrid

After the 2017 ESC Congress, Barcelona (Spain) became the city with most congresses since 1988(6), followed by Stockholm (Sweden) (5) and then by Amsterdam (Netherlands) and Vienna (Austria) and Munich (Germany) (4 times each as of 2018). Some congresses (1994, 2006 and 2019) were organised jointly with the World Heart Federation under the name of "World Congress of Cardiology".
