= EuroIntervention =

- Discipline: Cardiology
- Language: English
- Edited by: Davide Capodanno

Publication details
- History: 2006-present
- Impact factor: 7.728 (2021)

Standard abbreviations
- ISO 4: EuroIntervention

Indexing
- ISSN: 1774-024X (print); 1969-6213 (web)
- OCLC no.: 768181196

Links
- Journal homepage

EuroIntervention is a peer-reviewed medical journal covering research in the field of percutaneous and surgical cardiovascular interventions. It is the official journal of EuroPCR and the European Association of Percutaneous Coronary Interventions. The editor-in-chief is Davide Capodanno.

== Abstracting and indexing ==
The journal is abstracted and indexed in Science Citation Index Expanded, MEDLINE, and Scopus. According to the Journal Citation Reports, the journal has a 2021 impact factor of 7,728.
