= Reclassification (accounting) =

A reclass or reclassification, in accounting, is a journal entry transferring an amount from one general ledger account to another. This can be done to correct a mistake; to record that long-term assets or liabilities have become current; or to record that an asset is now being used for a different purpose (e.g. lands becoming investment property intended for resale, rather than as property, plant, and equipment used in production).

== Example ==
A $500 purchase of office supplies was charged to building maintenance by accident. The correcting entry would be handled in one of at least two ways:

1) If your system recorded the $500 to Building Maintenance, it needs to be reversed out, as this is the most common method:

Office supplies Dr. $500

 to Building maintenance ...      -$500

2) If your system records final values only, in which case you are now updating the original record:

Office supplies Dr. $500

 to Building maintenance ...      $0
