= Deutsche Gesellschaft für Kardiologie =

German medical research organization based in Düsseldorf

The Deutsche Gesellschaft für Kardiologie (DGK; German Cardiac Society in English) is a German medical research organization based in Düsseldorf. It is a member of the European Society of Cardiology, and the World Heart Federation.

They award the Arthur Weber Prize for excellence in the field of cardiology.
