= Microbial collagenase =

Class of enzymes

Identifiers
- EC no.: 3.4.24.3
- CAS no.: 2593923

Databases
- IntEnz: IntEnz view
- BRENDA: BRENDA entry
- ExPASy: NiceZyme view
- KEGG: KEGG entry
- MetaCyc: metabolic pathway
- PRIAM: profile
- PDB structures: RCSB PDB PDBe PDBsum
Search
- PMC: articles
- PubMed: articles
- NCBI: proteins

Microbial collagenase (EC 3.4.24.3, Clostridium histolyticum collagenase, clostridiopeptidase A, collagenase A, collagenase I, Achromobacter iophagus collagenase, collagenase, aspergillopeptidase C, nucleolysin, azocollase, metallocollagenase, soycollagestin, Clostridium histolyticum proteinase A, clostridiopeptidase II, MMP-8, clostridiopeptidase I, collagen peptidase, collagen protease, collagenase MMP-1, metalloproteinase-1, kollaza, matrix metalloproteinase-1, matrix metalloproteinase-8, matirx metalloproteinase-18, interstitial collagenase) is an enzyme. This enzyme catalyses the following chemical reaction

Digestion of native collagen in the triple helical region at -Gly bonds. With synthetic peptides, a preference is shown for Gly at P3 and P1', Pro and Ala at P2 and P2', and hydroxyproline, Ala or Arg at P3'

Six species of metalloendopeptidase acting on native collagen can be isolated from the medium of Clostridium histolyticum.

== See also ==
- Collagenase
