= European Society of Cardiology =

Non-profit professional association

European Society of Cardiology (ESC)
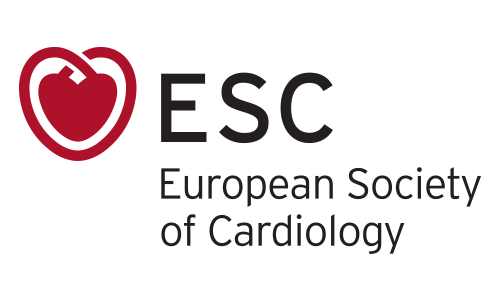
- Established: 1950
- Mission: To reduce the burden of cardiovascular disease.
- President: Thomas Lüscher (current), Cecilia Linde (President-Elect)
- Location: Sophia Antipolis, France
- Website: http://www.escardio.org

The European Society of Cardiology (ESC) is an independent non-profit, non-governmental professional association, based in Sophia Antipolis on the French Riviera, that works to advance the prevention, diagnosis and management of diseases of the heart and blood vessels, and improve scientific understanding of the heart and vascular system. This is done by:

- Disseminating evidence-based, scientific knowledge through courses, webinars, scientific journals, books and an annual cardiovascular congress.
- Harmonising standards of care through the publication of ESC Clinical Practice Guidelines.
- Shaping heart-health policy and regulation by fostering partnerships and providing scientific expertise and independent data.

Most of the approximately 100,000 ESC members are cardiologists, cardiovascular nurses and allied professionals wishing to increase their knowledge and update their skills. The association adheres to the Alliance for Biomedical Research in Europe Code of Conduct.

== History ==
The ESC was founded in 1950. Its headquarters is located in the technology park of Sophia Antipolis between Nice and Cannes, in the south of France. The first ESC-organised congress, The European Congress of Cardiology was held in London in September 1952.

In February 2013, the ESC opened the European Heart Agency in Brussels, close to the European Parliament complex, in order to have a base in the political and legislative capital of Europe.

== Structure ==
The 57 institutional members of the ECS.

The ESC is governed by an elected board of volunteers who are cardiovascular experts.

Its activities are overseen by dedicated committees made up of more than 2,000 volunteers.

Employed staff support ESC volunteers in the development and management of its activities. ESC staff report to the chief executive officer, who reports to the president and management group of the ESC Board.

The ESC comprises 57 National Cardiac Societies, 7 sub-specialty associations and 22 sub-specialty working groups and councils. Since 2013, additional support has been developed within the sub-specialty communities to address the special interests and needs of young physicians.

== Congresses & events ==
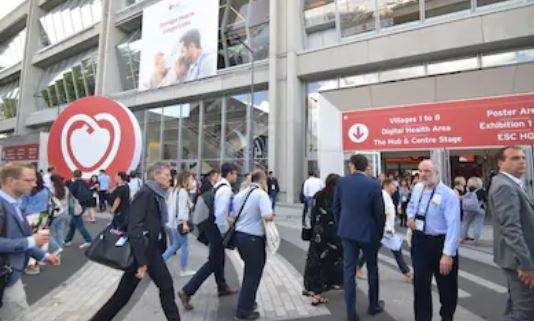
ESC Congress 2019, Paris

The ESC organises numerous cardiology congresses each year, including the largest cardiology congress in the world, ESC Congress.

Annual or biennial sub-specialty congresses address acute cardiac care (Acute CardioVascular Care), cardiac imaging (EuroEcho), prevention, rehabilitation and sports cardiology (ESC Preventive Cardiology), nuclear cardiology and cardiac CT (ICNC-CT), magnetic resonance (EuroCMR congress), interventional cardiology (EuroPCR), heart failure (Heart Failure), heart rhythm and electrophysiology (EHRA), as well as basic science (Frontiers in CardioVascular Biolomedicine).

== Clinical practice guidelines ==
The ESC produces clinical practice guidelines for cardiology professionals from evidence-based clinical trials data. The guidelines aim to present all the relevant evidence on a particular clinical issue in order to help physicians weigh the benefits and risks of particular diagnostic or therapeutic procedures.

== Fellowship ==
A Fellow of the European Society of Cardiology is a cardiologist considered to be a person who has had a significant experience in the field and who has distinguished themself individually in clinical, educational, investigational, organisational or professional aspects of cardiology. Fellows have the right to use the postnominal designation of the FESC.

== Journals ==
The ESC publishes 17 periodicals covering cardiovascular medicine and research:

- Cardiovascular Research (CVR)
- e-Journal of Cardiology Practice
- European Heart Journal (EHJ)
- European Heart Journal – Acute Cardiovascular Care (EHJ-ACVC)
- European Heart Journal – Cardiovascular Imaging (EHJ-CI)
- European Heart Journal – Cardiovascular Pharmacotherapy (EHJ-CVP)
- European Heart Journal – Case Reports (EHJ-CR)
- European Heart Journal – Digital Health (EHJ-DH)
- European Heart Journal – Open (EHJ-O)
- European Heart Journal – Quality of Care and Clinical Outcomes (EHJ-QCCO)
- European Heart Journal – Supplements (EHJ-S)
- European Journal of Cardiovascular Nursing (EJCN)
- European Journal of Heart Failure (EJHF)
- European Journal of Preventive Cardiology (EJPC)
- ESC Heart Failure (ESC HF)
- EP Europace
- EuroIntervention

== Books ==
The ESC publishes numerous books for those studying cardiology and subspecialties in the field:

- The EACVI Echo Handbook
- The EACVI Textbook of Cardiovascular Magnetic Resonance
- The EACVI Textbook of Echocardiography, 2nd edn.
- The EHRA Book of Interventional Electrophysiology
- The EHRA Book of Pacemaker, ICD, and CRT Troubleshooting
- ESC CardioMed
- The ESC Handbook of Cardiovascular Rehabilitation
- The ESC Handbook of Preventive Cardiology
- The ESC Handbook on Cardiovascular Pharmacotherapy
- The ESC Textbook of Cardiovascular Development
- The ESC Textbook of Cardiovascular Imaging, 3rd edn.
- The ESC Textbook of Cardiovascular Medicine, 3rd edn.
- The ESC Textbook of Intensive and Acute Cardiovascular Care, 3rd edn.
- The ESC Textbook of Preventive Cardiology
- The ESC Textbook of Sports Cardiology
- The ESC Textbook of Vascular Biology
- PCR–EAPCI Percutaneous Interventional Cardiovascular Medicine Textbook

== Education ==
The ESC supports continuing medical training and development by offering a broad portfolio of needs-based education initiatives, including online and in-person courses as well as post-graduate programmes led by experts in cardiology.

Grants to help offset education costs are offered by the association.

== Webinars ==
Among the educational products produced by the ESC are interactive webinars that include case-based presentations, online assessments, and live discussions with key opinion leaders in cardiology. The society hosts an online platform for these presentations called ESC 365.

== Research ==
Despite advances in cardiovascular medicine, cardiovascular disease (CVD) remains the world's biggest killer. The ESC collects cardiovascular data from across its 57 members countries through its 'Atlas of Cardiology' to better understand why and how CVD mortality can be reduced.

This compendium underlines major healthcare gaps and inequalities and provides robust data for budget owners and decision-makers who can improve population health at a European level.

The ESC operates a registry programme supported by pharmaceutical industry sponsors.

== Advocacy ==
The ESC leverages the knowledge, network and influence of the cardiology profession to promote policy, regulation and research funding that advances cardiovascular science, supports high quality healthcare, and encourages evidence-based decision making.

== See also ==
- HeartScore
