= QRISK =

Prediction algorithm for cardiovascular disease

- Purpose: prediction of cardiovascular disease

QRISK3 (the most recent version of QRISK) is a prediction algorithm for cardiovascular disease (CVD) that uses traditional risk factors (age, systolic blood pressure, smoking status and ratio of total serum cholesterol to high-density lipoprotein cholesterol) together with body mass index, ethnicity, measures of deprivation, family history, chronic kidney disease, rheumatoid arthritis, atrial fibrillation, diabetes mellitus, and antihypertensive treatment.

A QRISK over 10 (10% risk of CVD event over the next ten years) indicates that primary prevention with lipid lowering therapy (such as statins) should be considered. In the UK, current National Institute for Health and Care Excellence (NICE) guidelines recommend using QRISK (as opposed to the Framingham Risk Score).

The algorithm has subsequently been validated by an independent team from the Centre for Statistics in Medicine (University of Oxford) using an external dataset. The results were published in the BMJ and demonstrated that QRISK performed better than Framingham . www.qrisk.org is updated annually to reflect changes in populations, data quality and national guidelines (such as a change in age range over which cardiovascular risk should be assessed). The inclusion of ethnicity and deprivation in the QRISK2 algorithm is designed to help prevent widening health inequalities. The QIntervention website combines QRISK with a similar risk prediction tool (www.qdiabetes.org) to calculate risk of cardiovascular disease and type 2 diabetes. www.qintervention.org also allows clinicians to assess 'what if' scenarios i.e. how risk might change with modification of risk factors such as weight loss, stopping smoking, use of statins and better blood pressure control.

QRISK has also been developed further to estimate individualised lifetime risk of cardiovascular disease.

== See also ==
- Preventive medicine
- Framingham Risk Score
