= Lown–Ganong–Levine syndrome =

Heart condition

- Specialty: Cardiology
- Symptoms: Palpitations
- Diagnostic method: Electrocardiogram, electrophysiological study
- Differential diagnosis: Wolff-Parkinson-White syndrome
- Medication: Medication, catheter ablation

Lown–Ganong–Levine syndrome (LGL) is a pre-excitation syndrome of the heart. Those with LGL syndrome have episodes of abnormal heart racing with a short PR interval and normal QRS complexes seen on their electrocardiogram when in a normal sinus rhythm. LGL syndrome was originally thought to be due to an abnormal electrical connection between the atria and the ventricles, but is now thought to be due to accelerated conduction through the atrioventricular node in the majority of cases. The syndrome is named after Bernard Lown, William Francis Ganong, Jr., and Samuel A. Levine.

== Signs and symptoms ==
In general, patients will be asymptomatic at baseline. During their tachyarrhythmia however, they may report palpitations, shortness of breath, syncope or presyncope. They will have a tachycardia. How well they tolerate their tachyarrhythmia is dictated by their physiologic reserve. A young, well patient may just have palpitations and the tachycardia alone. However, an older patient with pre-existing (discrete) cardiovascular disease may additionally experience hypotension and syncope. Very fast heart rates can be detrimental even in well patients though.

== Pathophysiology ==
LGL syndrome was originally thought to involve a rapidly conducting accessory pathway (bundle of James) that connects the atria directly to the bundle of His, bypassing the slowly conducting atrioventricular node. However, the majority of those with LGL in whom electrophysiological studies have been performed do not have any evidence of an accessory pathway or structural abnormality. Whilst in a minority of cases some form of intranodal or paranodal fibers that bypass all or part of the atrioventricular node can be found with subsequent conduction down the normal His-Purkinje system, in most cases the short PR interval is caused by accelerated conduction through the atrioventricular node. LGL syndrome is therefore felt to represent a clinical syndrome with multiple different underlying causes.

== Diagnosis ==
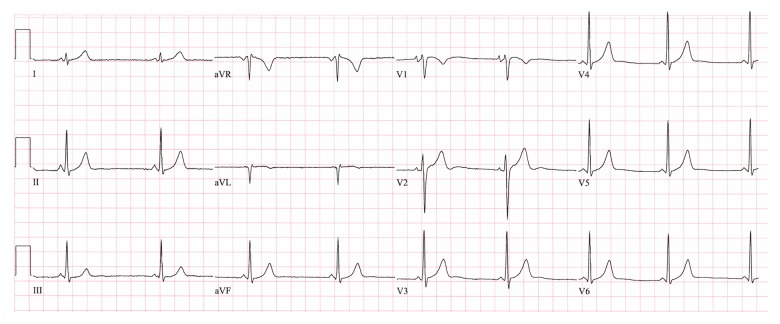
ECG recorded from a 17-year-old male with Lown-Ganong-Levine syndrome

LGL syndrome is diagnosed in a person who has experienced episodes of abnormal heart racing (arrhythmias) who has a PR interval less than or equal to 0.12 second (120 ms) with normal QRS complex configuration and duration on their resting ECG. .

LGL can be distinguished from Wolff–Parkinson–White syndrome (WPW) syndrome because the delta waves seen in WPW syndrome are not seen in LGL syndrome. The QRS complex is often normal but can also be narrow in LGL syndrome, as opposed to WPW, because ventricular conduction is via the His-Purkinje system. Lown–Ganong–Levine syndrome is a clinical diagnosis that came about before the advent of electrophysiology studies. It is important to be aware that not all WPW ECGs have a delta wave; the absence of a delta wave does not conclusively rule out WPW.

== Prognosis ==
Individuals with LGL syndrome do not carry an increased risk of sudden death. The only morbidity associated with the syndrome is the occurrence of paroxysmal episodes of tachycardia which may be of several types, including sinus tachycardia, atrioventricular nodal re-entrant tachycardia, atrial fibrillation, or atrial flutter.

== See also ==
- Cardiac electrophysiology
- Electrocardiogram
- Electrophysiology study
- Premature ventricular contraction
- Wolff–Parkinson–White syndrome
