= Permanent junctional reciprocating tachycardia =

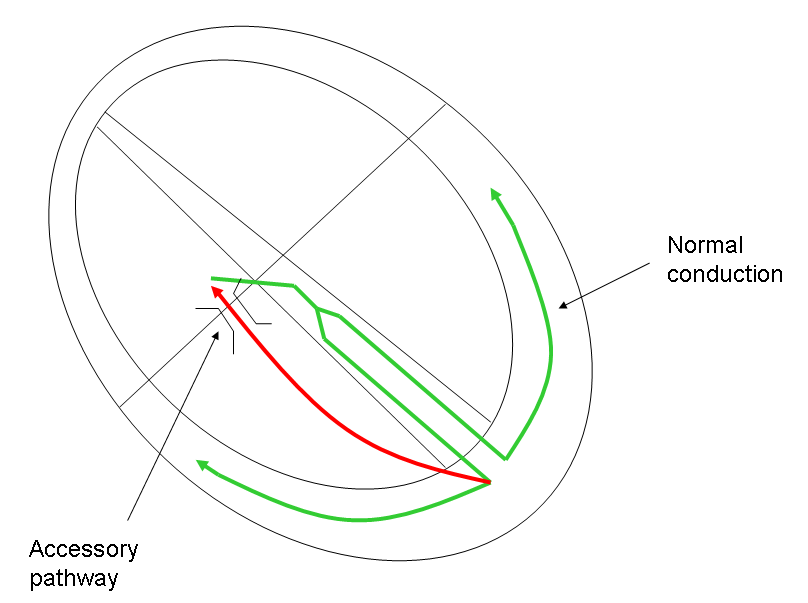
- Conduction pathway in atrioventricular reentrant tachycardia, a form of supraventricular tachycardia

Permanent junctional reciprocating tachycardia (PJRT) is a rare cardiac arrhythmia. It is a supraventricular tachycardia, and a cause of atrioventricular reentrant tachycardia (AVRT). PJRT can cause chronic tachycardia that, untreated, leads to cardiomyopathy. The cause is an accessory pathway in the heart which conducts from the ventricles back to the atria. Unlike the accessory pathway in a more common cause of AVRT, Wolff–Parkinson–White syndrome, the accessory pathway in PJRT conducts slowly. This means that the associated tachycardia may be subclinical and only diagnosed at a late stage, after significant damage to the heart has been caused from prolonged and recurrent episodes of AVRT. While PJRT generally presents itself in infants, and often immediately after birth, few adults can suffer from a sudden onset of PJRT in which the degrading accessory pathway can more often than not be in a non-posteroseptal site.

== Symptoms ==
Palpitations during exercise or stress may be the presenting symptom. Because the initial symptoms are often mild, there may be significant myocardial damage at the time of diagnosis. It is therefore possible for these patients to present with the symptoms of heart failure, such as shortness of breath, fatigue and oedema (fluid retention).

== Cause ==
In-between episodes there is normal electrical conduction in the heart. During an episode of AVRT caused by PJRT, the accessory pathway conducts electrical activity from the ventricles directly back to the atria at the end of systole, which triggers the atria to contract, and the current to pass back to the ventricles again via the atrioventricular node (AV node); see diagram.

== Diagnosis ==
There may be no signs outside of an episode. An electrocardiogram (ECG) undertaken during an episode of AVRT demonstrates typical features of retrograde (inverted) p-waves in the inferior leads II, III, aVF, and V4–V6 with a long RP′ interval. The P:QRS ratio would be 1:1 and they would be narrow complexes.

== Treatment ==
Termination of an episode of AVRT in PJRT can be achieved with vagal manouvres, antiarrhythmic medications or DC cardioversion. Long-term management is best achieved with catheter ablation.

== Prognosis ==
Without treatment, the prevalence of tachycardia-induced cardiomyopathy has been reported to be between 20% and 50%, however most patients who undergo ablation have significant improvement in their cardiac function
