= Paroxysmal supraventricular tachycardia =

Episodes of abnormally fast heart rhythm

- Other names: Supraventricular tachycardia, paroxysmal atrial tachycardia (PAT)
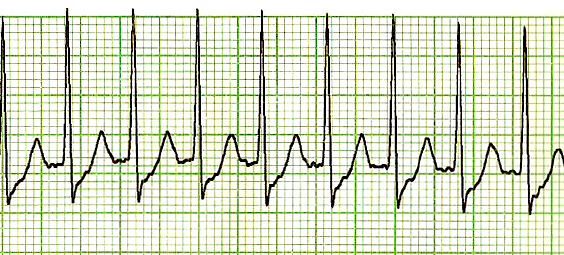
- Lead II electrocardiogram strip showing PSVT with a heart rate of about 180.
- Specialty: Emergency medicine, cardiology
- Symptoms: Palpitations, feeling lightheaded, increased heart rate, sweating, shortness of breath, chest pain
- Usual onset: Starts and stops suddenly
- Causes: Not known
- Risk factors: Alcohol, caffeine, nicotine, psychological stress, Wolff-Parkinson-White syndrome
- Diagnostic method: Electrocardiogram
- Prevention: Catheter ablation
- Treatment: Valsalva maneuver, adenosine, calcium channel blockers, synchronized cardioversion
- Prognosis: Generally good
- Frequency: 2.3 per 1000 people

Paroxysmal supraventricular tachycardia (PSVT) is a type of supraventricular tachycardia, named for its intermittent episodes of abrupt onset and termination. Often people have no symptoms. Otherwise symptoms may include palpitations, feeling lightheaded, sweating, shortness of breath, and chest pain.

The cause is not known. Risk factors include alcohol, psychostimulants such as caffeine, nicotine, and amphetamines, psychological stress, and Wolff-Parkinson-White syndrome, which often is inherited. The underlying mechanism typically involves an accessory pathway that results in re-entry. Diagnosis is typically by an electrocardiogram (ECG) which shows narrow QRS complexes and a fast heart rhythm typically between 150 and 240 beats per minute.

Vagal maneuvers, such as the Valsalva maneuver, are often used as the initial treatment. If not effective and the person has a normal blood pressure the medication adenosine may be tried. If adenosine is not effective a calcium channel blocker or beta blocker may be used. Otherwise synchronized cardioversion is the treatment. Future episodes can be prevented by catheter ablation.

About 2.3 per 1000 people have paroxysmal supraventricular tachycardia. Problems typically begin in those 12 to 45 years old. Women are more often affected than men. Outcomes are generally good in those who otherwise have a normal heart. An ultrasound of the heart may be done to rule out underlying heart problems.

== Signs and symptoms ==
Symptoms may include palpitations, feeling faint, sweating, shortness of breath, and chest pain. Episodes start and end suddenly.

== Types ==
- AV nodal re-entrant tachycardia (AVNRT) makes up 56% of cases
- Atrioventricular reentrant tachycardia (AVRT) makes up 27% of cases
  - Wolff-Parkinson-White syndrome
- Paroxysmal atrial tachycardia makes up 17% of cases

== Anatomy ==
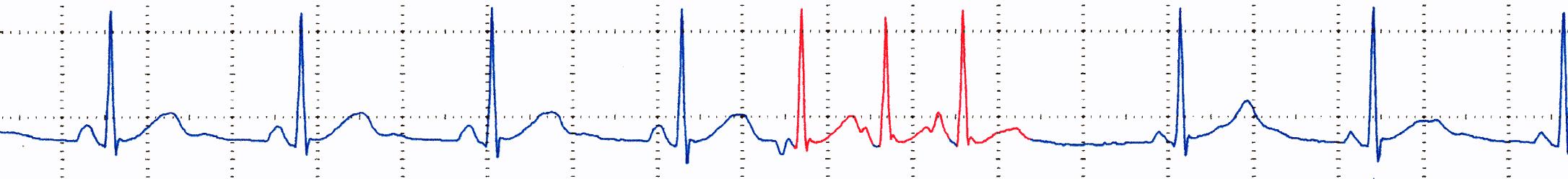
Lead II of electrocardiogram shows 3 rapid heartbeats, supraventricualar extrasistoles due to atrioventricular nodal reentry, shown as red, demonstrating unexplained onset and stop of the episode in paroxysmal supraventricular tachycardia among normal heart rhythm shown as blue

Paroxysmal supraventricular tachycardia is a type of arrhythmia that originates in the atrioventricular (AV) junction. The most common underlying anatomical cause of PSVT is atrioventricular nodal reentry, which accounts for more than half of the cases.

The underlying anatomical causes of PSVT, specifically atrioventricular nodal reentry, involve the presence of two functionally distinct conduction pathways within the AV node and the formation of a reentrant circuit that sustains the tachycardia. These pathways within the AV node are known as the fast pathway and the slow pathway.

The AV node is the structure that controls how electrical signals travel between the upper chambers (atria) and lower chambers (ventricles). During normal sinus rhythm, these signals pass through only one pathway, known as the fast pathway. The fast pathway conducts signals quickly but has a longer rest period before it can send another signal. However, in people with PSVT caused by atrioventricular nodal reentry, both the fast and the slow pathways are activated. The slow pathway conducts signals more slowly but has a shorter rest period.

In a healthy heart during normal sinus rhythm, only either the fast pathway or the slow pathway is used at any given moment for conducting electrical signals through the AV node, not both simultaneously.

During PSVT episodes, an irregular heartbeat is triggered by an early electrical signal from one of the atria. This premature signal enters both pathways simultaneously. It encounters no problem traveling along the slow pathway because its conduction speed matches up well with this specific arrhythmia type. However, it faces difficulty passing through effectively down the faster path since it takes slightly longer for that path to be ready following the conduction of a recent signal. At this point, if retrograde or backward flow overcomes the forward movement's pace in the fast pathway, then unwanted feedback further intensifies the rapid heartbeat until something intervenes to stop the episode. There is currently no solid understanding on what stops the episode in PSVT.

== Treatment ==
Treatment depends on the type of heart rhythm shown on an electrocardiogram test, and the stability of the patient's blood circulation.

If a patient has low blood pressure, difficulty breathing, chest pain, shock, or confusion, they are considered unstable and must have an electrocardiogram result checked to determine if the heart is beating normally. If this is not the case, cardioversion, which uses electricity to reset the heartbeat, should be performed urgently. If an electrocardiogram shows that the high heart rate is caused by something other than PSVT itself (such as a reduction in blood flow to the heart), injections of drugs called beta-blockers may help. The same medication can also be used if someone is found to be unstable due to inappropriate sinus tachycardia (a fast but unexplained normal heartbeat).

AV nodal blocking can be achieved in at least three ways:

=== Physical maneuvers ===
A number of physical maneuvers increase the resistance of the AV node to transmit impulses (AV nodal block), principally through activation of the parasympathetic nervous system, conducted to the heart by the vagus nerve. These manipulations are collectively referred to as vagal maneuvers.

The Valsalva maneuver should be the first vagal maneuver tried and works by increasing intra-thoracic pressure and affecting baroreceptors (pressure sensors) within the arch of the aorta. It is carried out by asking the patient to hold his/her breath while trying to exhale forcibly as if straining during a bowel movement. Holding the nose and exhaling against the obstruction has a similar effect. Pressing down gently on the top of closed eyes may also bring heartbeat back to normal rhythm for some people with atrial or supraventricular tachycardia (SVT). This is known as the oculocardiac reflex. A 2023 review confirms the success of the Valsalva maneuver as a non-pharmaceutical intervention in PSVT.

=== Medications ===
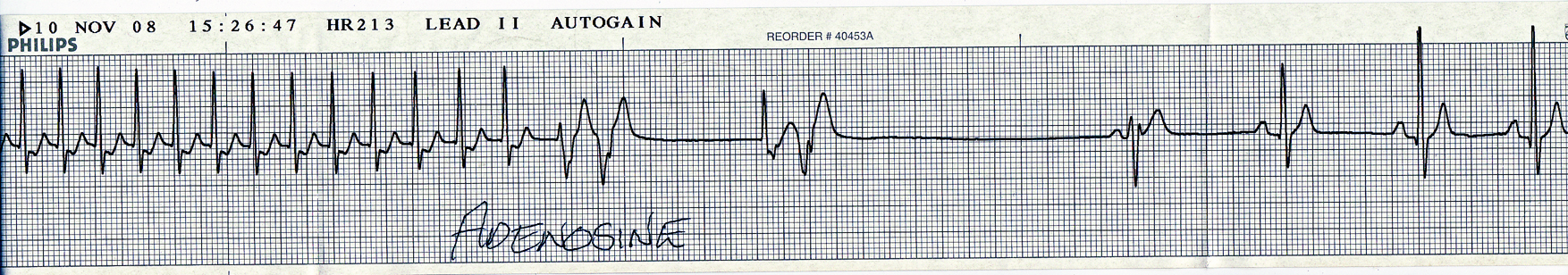
Termination of PSVT following adenosine administration

Adenosine, an ultra-short-acting AV nodal blocking agent, is indicated if vagal maneuvers are not effective. If unsuccessful or the PSVT recurs, calcium channel blockers, such as diltiazem or verapamil, are recommended. Adenosine may be safely used during pregnancy. Adenosine can be administered together with nondihydropyridine calcium channel blockers.

Calcium channel blockers such as verapamil and diltiazem have a longer half-life compared to adenosine. Although these blockers are safe when administered slowly, adenosine is considered safer and particularly useful in cases where an electrocardiogram does not provide clear information. Calcium channel blockers and verapamil have similar effectiveness. However, despite being safer overall, adenosine was associated with higher costs and an increased likelihood of arrhythmia recurrence compared to calcium channel blockers.

SVT that does not involve the AV node may respond to other anti-arrhythmic drugs such as sotalol or amiodarone.

=== Cardioversion ===
If the person is hemodynamically unstable or other treatments have not been effective, synchronized electrical cardioversion may be used. In children this is often done with a dose of 0.5 to 1 J/Kg.

=== Invasive treatment ===
Radiofrequency catheter ablation (RFCA) is a safe and effective treatment in both adults and children. RFCA is considered a minimally invasive procedure rather than surgery. It does not involve making large incisions or opening up the chest cavity. Instead, it is performed using thin catheters that are inserted through blood vessels and guided to the heart. The catheter delivers radiofrequency energy to specific areas of the heart to disrupt abnormal electrical pathways causing arrhythmias. While it may require mild sedation or local anesthesia, it doesn't typically involve extensive cutting or suturing of tissue associated with traditional surgical procedures.

Over the decade of 2010s, there have been significant advancements in catheter ablation techniques for ventricular arrhythmias, including improved mapping methods like ultra-high density mapping and new energy sources like electroporation. New types of catheters, such as lattice and saline-enhanced radiofrequency catheters, provide more precise and longer-lasting tissue damage. Additionally, cardiac imaging technologies like MRI can help identify abnormal areas causing arrhythmias and evaluate the success of the ablation procedure.
