= Pre-excitation syndrome =

Heart disorder in which the cardiac ventricles activate too early

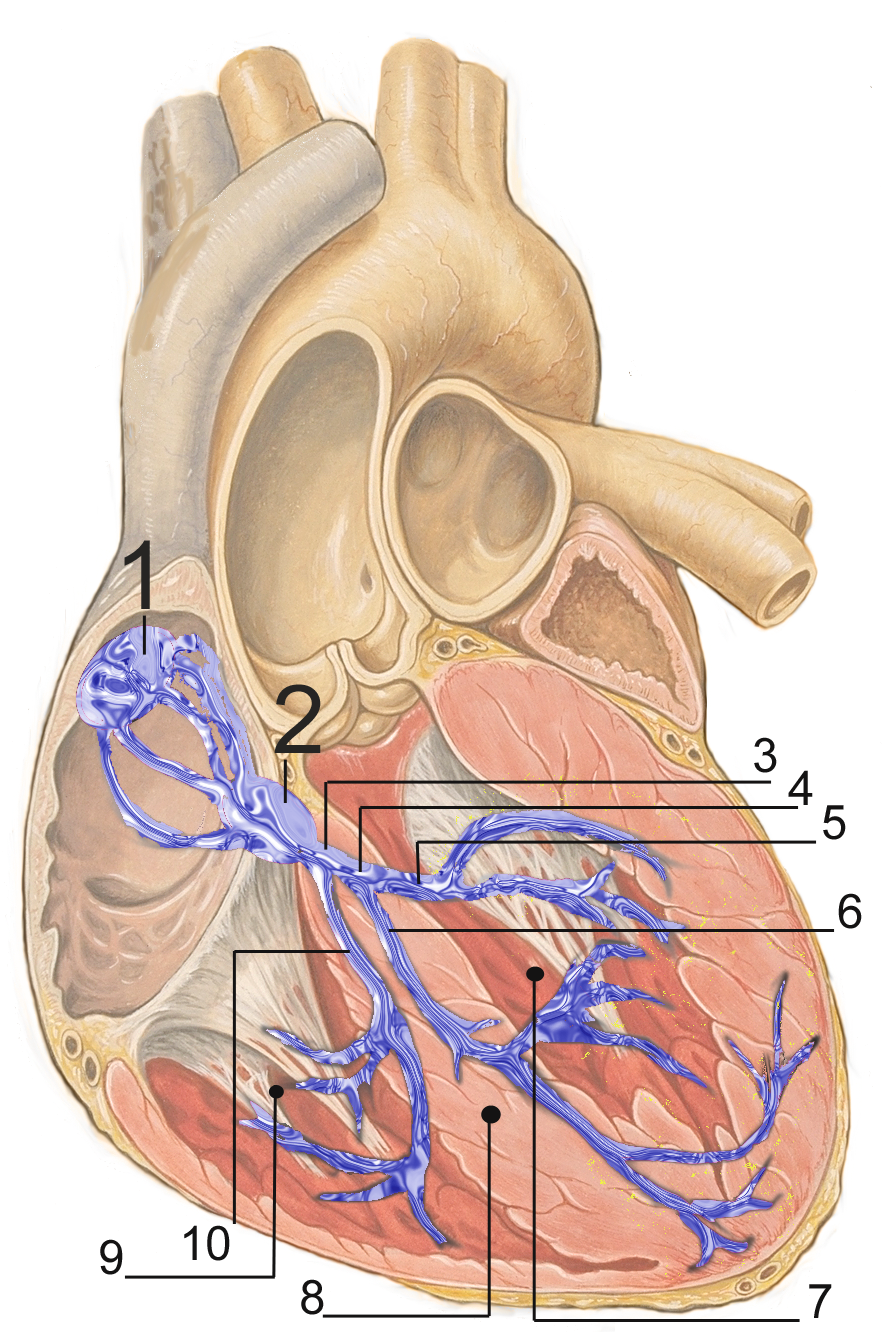
- Electrical conduction system of the heart (accessory pathways not shown): 1. Sinoatrial node 2. Atrioventricular node 3. Bundle of His; 4. Left bundle branch 5. Left anterior fascicle 6. Left-posterior fascicle 7. Left ventricle 8. Ventricular septum 9. Right ventricle 10. Right bundle branch
- Specialty: Cardiology

Pre-excitation syndrome is a heart condition in which part of the cardiac ventricles are activated too early. Pre-excitation is caused by an abnormal electrical connection or accessory pathway between or within the cardiac chambers. Pre-excitation may not cause any symptoms but may lead to palpitations caused by abnormal heart rhythms. It is usually diagnosed using an electrocardiogram, but may only be found during an electrophysiological study. The condition may not require any treatment at all, but symptoms can be controlled using medication or catheter ablation.

== Types ==
Several types of pre-excitation syndrome have been described.

Type	Conduction pathway	PR interval	QRS interval	Delta wave
Wolff–Parkinson–White syndrome	Bundle of Kent (atria to ventricles)	short	long	yes
Lown–Ganong–Levine syndrome	"James bundle" (atria to bundle of His)	short	normal	no
Mahaim-type	Mahaim fibers	normal	long	no

== Pathophysiology ==
Normally, the atria and the ventricles are electrically isolated, and electrical contact between them exists only at the "atrioventricular node". In all pre-excitation syndromes, at least one more conductive pathway is present. Physiologically, the normal electrical depolarization wave is delayed at the atrioventricular node to allow the atria to contract before the ventricles. However, there is no such delay in the abnormal pathway, so the electrical stimulus passes to the ventricle by this tract faster than via normal atrioventricular/bundle of His system, and the ventricles are depolarized (excited) before (pre-) normal conduction system.
