= Norverapamil =

Names
- IUPAC name (RS)-2-(3,4-Dimethoxyphenyl)-5-[2-(3,4-dimethoxyphenyl)ethylamino]-2-isopropylpentanenitrile

Identifiers
CAS Number	67018-85-3
3D model (JSmol)	Interactive image
ChEBI	CHEBI:132050
ChEMBL	ChEMBL1298
ChemSpider	94724
ECHA InfoCard	100.060.476
EC Number	266-544-8
PubChem CID	104972
UNII	957Z3K3R56
CompTox Dashboard (EPA)	DTXSID80873799
- InChI: InChI=1S/C26H36N2O4/c1-19(2)26(18-27,21-9-11-23(30-4)25(17-21)32-6)13-7-14-28-15-12-20-8-10-22(29-3)24(16-20)31-5/h8-11,16-17,19,28H,7,12-15H2,1-6H3 Key: UPKQNCPKPOLASS-UHFFFAOYSA-N; InChI=1/C26H36N2O4/c1-19(2)26(18-27,21-9-11-23(30-4)25(17-21)32-6)13-7-14-28-15-12-20-8-10-22(29-3)24(16-20)31-5/h8-11,16-17,19,28H,7,12-15H2,1-6H3 Key: UPKQNCPKPOLASS-UHFFFAOYAQ
- SMILES: CC(C)C(CCCNCCC1=CC(=C(C=C1)OC)OC)(C#N)C2=CC(=C(C=C2)OC)OC

Properties
Chemical formula	C_{26}H_{36}N_{2}O_{4}
Molar mass	440.584 g·mol^{−1}

Related compounds
Related compounds	Arverapamil
- Except where otherwise noted, data are given for materials in their standard state (at 25 °C [77 °F], 100 kPa). verify (what is ?) Infobox references

Norverapamil is a calcium channel blocker. It is the main active metabolite of verapamil. It contributes significantly to the therapeutic effects of verapamil, which include the treatment of hypertension, angina, and arrhythmias. Despite being a metabolite of verapamil, norverapamil retains much of the pharmacological activity of verapamil, particularly impacting the calcium ion flow through L-type calcium channels, leading to its therapeutic cardiovascular and vasodilation effects.

== Pharmacodynamics ==
Norverapamil inhibits L-type calcium channels located in the heart and blood vessels, leading to several pharmacological effects including vasodilation, negative inotropy, and negative dromotropy. Norverapamil relaxes the smooth muscles of blood vessels, reducing systemic vascular resistance and consequently lowering blood pressure. Also, by decreasing calcium influx into heart muscle cells, it is able to lower myocardial contractility. This makes it useful in reducing the workload of the heart, particularly in cardiovascular conditions such as angina. Norverapamil is also able to slow atrioventricular (AV) conduction, which is useful in controlling supra-ventricular arrhythmias by controlling the heart rate through reduced electrical conduction.

== Pharmacokinetics ==
Norverapamil is a metabolite of verapamil and is primarily produced by the N-demethylation performed by the CYP3A4 enzyme in the liver. Its half-life is approximately 6–9 hours, and it is eliminated primarily through renal excretion. As approximately 80% of the drug is protein-bound, its distribution is significantly influenced by factors such as liver function and serum protein levels.

The effects of norverapamil are dose-dependent, with higher doses producing more pronounced effects. In individuals with hepatic or renal impairments, dose adjustments are necessary to avoid potential toxicity due to its slow metabolism.

== Interaction with P-Glycoprotein ==
Norverapamil, like verapamil, interacts with P-glycoprotein (P-gp), as a calcium channel antagonist. P-gp is a membrane transporter that affects the absorption, distribution, and elimination of many drugs. As a substrate, norverapamil’s absorption is influenced by P-gp, while as an inhibitor, it may affect the bioavailability of other drugs that rely on P-gp for elimination. These interactions are clinically significant when used alongside other P-gp substrates, such as digoxin, increasing their blood concentrations and potentially leading to adverse effects.

== Factors that affect metabolism ==
Both sex and age have been shown to influence the metabolism of norverapamil. One key observation is that women tend to produce more norverapamil than men, which may be attributed to higher CYP3A4 enzyme activity or lower P-glycoprotein activity in women. Additionally, both sex and age contribute to differeneces in the stereoselective formation of noreverapamil, which affect the drug's effectiveness. However, there is some debate about whether these variations are entirely due to sex differences or if it's simply factors like differences in lean muscle mass and size play a role in drug metabolism.

Interestingly, while sex and age are important factors, food intake does not significantly affect the metabolism or activity of norverapamil. Studies suggest that meals do not alter the drug’s pharmacokinetics, meaning its activity remains consistent regardless of food consumption.

Another factor that can alter the metabolism and activity of norverapamil are drugs which interact with CYP3A4 enymes and P-glycoproteins. One such example of a drug is the cholesterol medication atorvastatin which inhibits both CYP3A4 enzymes and P-Glycoproteins.
