= Verapamil =

Calcium channel blocker medication

- Molecular structure of verapamil

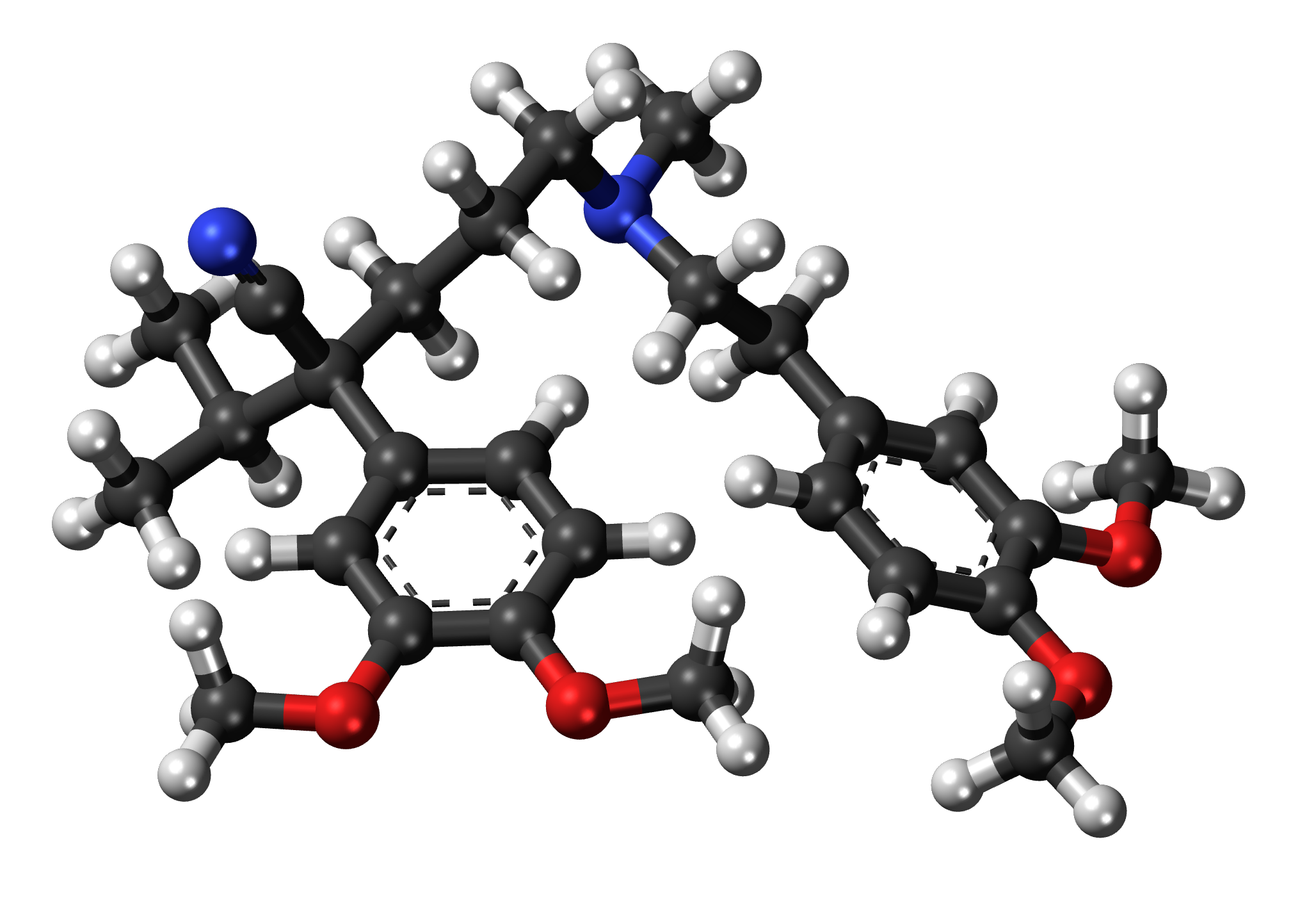
- 3D representation of a verapamil molecule

Clinical data
- Pronunciation: /vɛˈræpəmɪl/ ve-RAP-ə-mil
- Trade names: Isoptin, Calan, others
- AHFS/Drugs.com: Monograph
- MedlinePlus: a684030
- License data: US DailyMed: Verapamil
- Pregnancy category: AU: C
- Routes of administration: By mouth, intravenous
- Drug class: Calcium channel blocker
- ATC code: C08DA01 (WHO)

Legal status
- Legal status: UK: POM (Prescription only); US: ℞-only; EU: Rx-only; In general: ℞ (Prescription only)

Pharmacokinetic data
- Bioavailability: 35.1%
- Metabolism: Liver
- Onset of action: 1 to 2 hours (oral); 3 to 5 minutes (IV bolus)
- Elimination half-life: 2.8–7.4 hours
- Excretion: Kidney: 11%

Identifiers
- IUPAC name: (RS)-2-(3,4-Dimethoxyphenyl)-5-{[2-(3,4-dimethoxyphenyl)ethyl](methyl)amino}-2-(propan-2-yl)pentanenitrile
- CAS Number: 52-53-9
- PubChem CID: 2520
- IUPHAR/BPS: 2406
- DrugBank: DB00661
- ChemSpider: 2425
- UNII: CJ0O37KU29
- KEGG: D02356; as HCl: D00619
- ChEBI: CHEBI:9948
- ChEMBL: ChEMBL6966
- CompTox Dashboard (EPA): DTXSID9041152
- ECHA InfoCard: 100.000.133

Chemical and physical data
- Formula: C_{27}H_{38}N_{2}O_{4}
- Molar mass: 454.611 g·mol^{−1}
- 3D model (JSmol): Interactive image
- Chirality: Racemic mixture
- SMILES: N#CC(c1cc(OC)c(OC)cc1)(CCCN(CCc2ccc(OC)c(OC)c2)C)C(C)C
- InChI: InChI=1S/C27H38N2O4/c1-20(2)27(19-28,22-10-12-24(31-5)26(18-22)33-7)14-8-15-29(3)16-13-21-9-11-23(30-4)25(17-21)32-6/h9-12,17-18,20H,8,13-16H2,1-7H3; Key:SGTNSNPWRIOYBX-UHFFFAOYSA-N

Verapamil, sold under various trade names, is a calcium channel blocker medication used for the treatment of high blood pressure, angina (chest pain from not enough blood flow to the heart), and supraventricular tachycardia. It may also be used for the prevention of migraines and cluster headaches. It is given by mouth or by injection into a vein.

Common side effects include headache, low blood pressure, nausea, and constipation. Other side effects include allergic reactions and muscle pains. It is not recommended in people with a slow heart rate or heart failure. It is believed to cause problems for the fetus if used during pregnancy. It is in the non–dihydropyridine calcium channel blocker family of medications.

Verapamil was approved for medical use in the United States in 1981. It is on the World Health Organization's List of Essential Medicines. Verapamil is available as a generic medication. Long acting formulations exist. In 2023, it was the 177th most commonly prescribed medication in the United States, with more than 2 million prescriptions.

== Medical uses ==
Verapamil is used for controlling ventricular rate in supraventricular tachycardia (SVT) and migraine headache prevention.

Verapamil is also used for the treatment of angina (chronic stable, vasospastic or Prinzmetal variant), unstable angina (crescendo, preinfarction), and for the prevention of paroxysmal supraventricular tachycardia (PSVT).

Verapamil is a class-IV antiarrhythmic and more effective than digoxin in controlling ventricular rate. Verapamil is not listed as a first line antihypertensive agent by the guidelines provided by JAMA in JNC-8. However, it may be used to treat hypertension if patient has co-morbid atrial fibrillation or other types of arrhythmia.

Verapamil is used intra-arterially to treat cerebral vasospasm. It is also used to treat cluster headaches. Tentative evidence supports the use of verapamil topically to treat plantar fibromatosis.

Use of verapamil in people with recent onset of type 1 diabetes may improve pancreatic beta cell function. In a 2023 meta-analysis involving data from two randomized controlled trials (113 patients with recent onset type-1 diabetes), it was demonstrated that the use of verapamil over one year was associated with significantly higher C-peptide area under the curve levels. Higher C-peptide levels means better pancreatic insulin production and beta cell function.

Verapamil has been reported to be effective in both short-term and long-term treatment of mania and hypomania. Addition of magnesium oxide to the verapamil treatment protocol enhances the antimanic effect.

== Contraindications ==
Use of verapamil is generally avoided in people with severe left ventricular dysfunction, hypotension (systolic blood pressure less than 90 mm Hg), cardiogenic shock, and hypersensitivity to verapamil. It is also contraindicated in people with atrial flutter or fibrillation and an existing accessory tract such as in Wolff-Parkinson-White syndrome.

== Side effects ==
The most common side effect of verapamil is constipation (7.3%). While the definite mechanism by which verapamil causes constipation has not been studied, studies have been conducted to rule out mechanisms of actions that might yield this adverse effect. A 1992 study found that verapamil causes a delay in colonic transit but does not affect upper gastrointestinal transit.

Other side effects include dizziness (3.3%), nausea (2.7%), low blood pressure (2.5%), and headache 2.2%. Other side effects seen in less than 2% of the population include: edema, congestive heart failure, pulmonary edema, diarrhea, fatigue, elevated liver enzymes, shortness of breath, low heart rate, atrioventricular block, rash and flushing. Along with other calcium channel blockers, verapamil is known to induce gingival enlargement.

=== Overdose ===
Acute overdose is often manifested by nausea, weakness, slow heart rate, dizziness, low blood pressure, and abnormal heart rhythms. Plasma, serum, or blood concentrations of verapamil and norverapamil, its major active metabolite, may be measured to confirm a diagnosis of poisoning in hospitalized patients or to aid in the medicolegal investigation of fatalities. Blood or plasma verapamil concentrations are usually in a range of 50–500 μg/L in persons on therapy with the drug, but may rise to 1–4 mg/L in acute overdose patients and are often at levels of 5–10 mg/L in fatal poisonings.

== Mechanism of action ==
Verapamil's mechanism in all cases is to block voltage-dependent calcium channels. In cardiac pharmacology, calcium channel blockers are considered class-IV antiarrhythmic agents. Since calcium channels are especially concentrated in the sinoatrial and atrioventricular nodes, these agents can be used to decrease impulse conduction through the AV node, thus protecting the ventricles from atrial tachyarrhythmias. Specific conditions that fall under the definition of atrial tachyarrhythmias are atrial fibrillation, atrial flutter, multifocal atrial tachycardia, paroxysmal supraventricular tachycardia, and so on.

Verapamil is also a Kv voltage gated potassium channel blocker.

Calcium channels are also present in the smooth muscle lining blood vessels. By relaxing the tone of this smooth muscle, calcium channel blockers dilate the blood vessels. This has led to their use in treating high blood pressure and angina pectoris. The pain of angina is caused by a deficit in oxygen supply to the heart.

Calcium channel blockers like verapamil dilate the coronary blood vessels, which increases the supply of blood and oxygen to the heart. They also cause dilatation of systemic peripheral vessels as well, causing a reduction in the workload of the heart. Thereby reducing myocardial oxygen consumption.

=== Cluster headaches ===
Preventive therapy with verapamil is believed to work because it has an effect on the circadian rhythm and on CGRPs, as CGRP-release is controlled by voltage-gated calcium channels.

== Pharmacokinetic details ==
More than 90% of verapamil is absorbed when given orally, but due to high first-pass metabolism, bioavailability is much lower (10–35%). It is 90% bound to plasma proteins and has a volume of distribution of 3–5 L/kg. It takes 1 to 2 hours to reach peak plasma concentration after oral administration. It is metabolized in the liver to at least 12 inactive metabolites (though one metabolite, norverapamil, retains 20% of the vasodilatory activity of the parent drug). As its metabolites, 70% is excreted in the urine and 16% in feces; 3–4% is excreted unchanged in urine. This is a nonlinear dependence between plasma concentration and dosage. Onset of action is 1 to 2 hours after oral dosage, and 3 to 5 minutes after intravenous bolus dosage. Biphasic or triphasic following IV administration; terminal elimination half-life is 2–8 hours. Plasma half-life of 2–8 or 4.5–12 hours after single oral dose or multiple oral doses, respectively. It is not cleared by hemodialysis. It is excreted in human milk. Because of the potential for adverse reaction in nursing infants, nursing should be discontinued while verapamil is administered.

== Veterinary use ==
Intra-abdominal adhesions are common in rabbits following surgery. Verapamil can be given postoperatively in rabbits which have suffered trauma to abdominal organs to prevent formation of these adhesions. Such effect was not documented in another study with ponies.

== Uses in cell biology ==
Verapamil inhibits the ATP-binding cassette (ABC) transporter family of proteins found in stem cells and has been used to study cancer stem cells (CSC) within head and neck squamous cell carcinomas.

Verapamil is also used in cell biology as an inhibitor of drug efflux pump proteins such as P-glycoprotein and other ABC transporter proteins. This is useful, as many tumor cell lines overexpress drug efflux pumps, limiting the effectiveness of cytotoxic drugs or fluorescent tags. It is also used in fluorescent cell sorting for DNA content, as it blocks efflux of a variety of DNA-binding fluorophores such as Hoechst 33342. Radioactively labelled verapamil and positron emission tomography can be used with to measure P-glycoprotein function.
