= Ebstein's anomaly =

Congenital heart defect

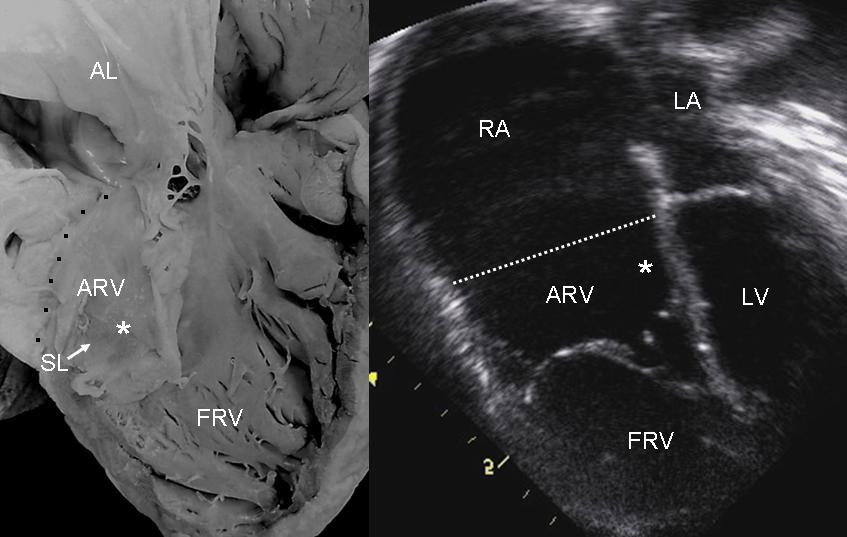
- Pathological specimen and ultrasound image of a heart with Ebstein's anomaly: Abbreviations: RA: right atrium; ARV: atrialized right ventricle; FRV: functional right ventricle; AL: anterior leaflet; SL: septal leaflet; LA: left atrium; LV: left ventricle; asterisk: grade II tethering of the tricuspid septal leaflet
- Specialty: Cardiac surgery
- Frequency: 0.005%

Ebstein's anomaly is a congenital heart defect in which the septal and posterior leaflets of the tricuspid valve are displaced downwards towards the apex of the right ventricle of the heart. Ebstein's anomaly has great anatomical heterogeneity that generates a wide spectrum of clinical features at presentation and is complicated by the fact that the lesion is often accompanied by other congenital cardiac lesions. It is classified as a critical congenital heart defect accounting for less than 1% of all congenital heart defects presenting in around 1 per 200,000 live births. Ebstein's anomaly usually presents with a systolic murmur (sometimes diastolic) and frequently with a gallop rhythm.

== Signs and symptoms ==
The annulus of the valve is still in the normal position. The valve leaflets, however, are to a varying degree, attached to the walls and septum of the right ventricle. A subsequent "atrialization" of a portion of the morphologic right ventricle (which is then contiguous with the right atrium) is seen. This causes the right atrium to be large and the anatomic right ventricle to be small in size.

- S3 heart sound
- S4 heart sound
- Triple or quadruple gallop due to widely split S1 and S2 sounds plus a loud S3 and/or S4
- Systolic murmur of tricuspid regurgitation = Holosystolic or early systolic murmur along the lower left sternal border depending on the severity of the regurgitation
- Right atrial hypertrophy
- Right ventricular conduction defects
- Wolff-Parkinson-White syndrome often accompanies

=== Related abnormalities ===
A diagram showing the downward displacement of the tricuspid valve from its normal position in the fibrous ring down into the right ventricle.

While Ebstein's anomaly is defined as the congenital displacement of the tricuspid valve towards the apex of the right ventricle, it is often associated with other abnormalities.

==== Anatomic abnormalities ====
Typically, anatomic abnormalities of the tricuspid valve exist, with enlargement of the anterior leaflet of the valve. The other leaflets are described as being plastered to the endocardium. Tethering the underlying ventricular wall is the most common for the posterior and septal leaflets, and sail-like anterior leaflets may be tethered to the RV free wall also.

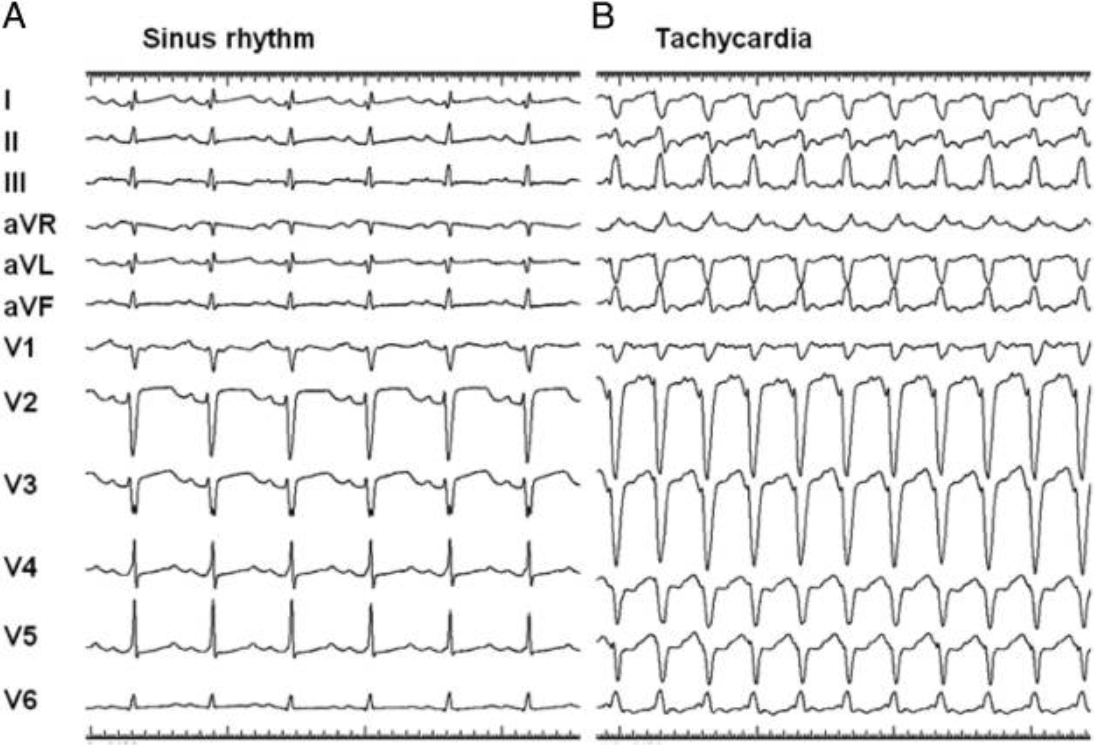
ECGs recorded during sinus rhythm and AVRT in a 9-year-old girl with Ebstein's anomaly and a Mahaim accessory pathway.

About 50% of individuals with Ebstein's anomaly have an associated shunt between the right and left atria, either an atrial septal defect or a patent foramen ovale.

==== Electrophysiologic abnormalities ====
About 50% of individuals with Ebstein's anomaly have an accessory pathway with evidence of Wolff-Parkinson-White syndrome, secondary to the atrialized right ventricular tissue. This can lead to abnormal heart rhythms including atrioventricular re-entrant tachycardia.

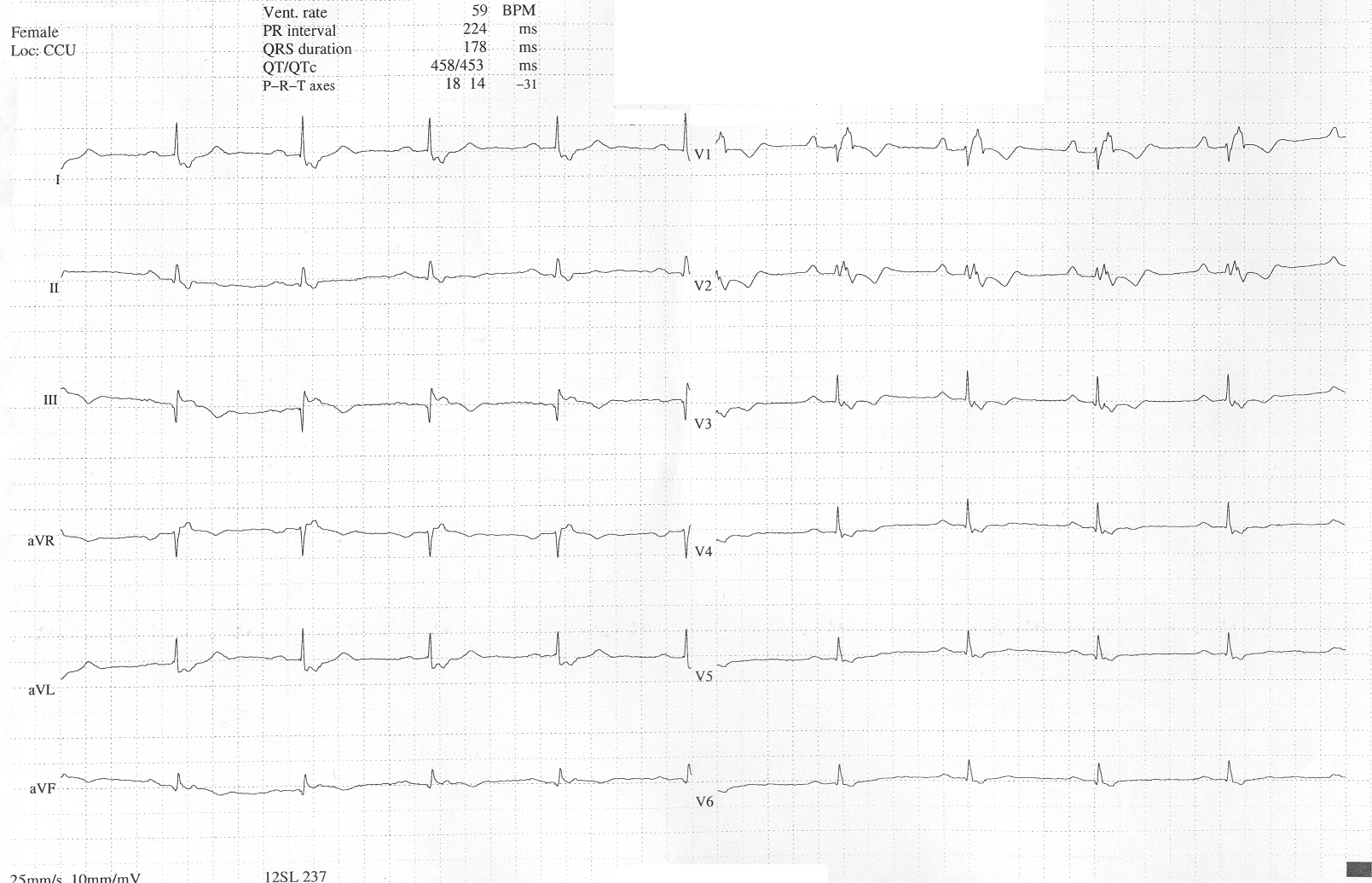
A 12-lead ECG of a woman with Ebstein's anomaly: The ECG shows signs of right atrial enlargement, best seen in V1. Other P waves are broad and tall, these are termed "Himalayan" P waves. Also, a right bundle-branch block pattern and a first-degree atrioventricular block (prolonged PR-interval) due to intra-atrial conduction delay are seen. No evidence of a Kent-bundle is seen in this patient. The T wave inversion in V1-4 and a marked Q wave in III occur; these changes are characteristic for Ebstein's anomaly and do not reflect ischemic ECG changes in this patient.

Other abnormalities that can be seen on the ECG include:

1. signs of right atrial enlargement or tall and broad 'Himalayan' P waves
2. first degree atrioventricular block manifesting as a prolonged PR-interval
3. low amplitude QRS complexes in the right precordial leads
4. atypical right bundle branch block
5. T wave inversion in V1-V4 and Q waves in V1-V4 and II, III and aVF.

== Risk factors ==
An enlargement of the aorta may occur; an increased risk of abnormality is seen in babies of women taking lithium during the first trimester of pregnancy (though some have questioned this) and in those with Wolff-Parkinson-White syndrome. Recent studies have also linked Ebstein’s anomaly with genetic mutations in the sarcomere gene MYH7, especially in populations of patients with left ventricular noncompaction (LVNC).

== Diagnosis ==
An echocardiogram is the most common and specific way to diagnose Ebstein’s anomaly because it effectively shows all 4 chambers of the heart, which displays the distance between the hinge point of the septal leaflet of the tricuspid valve and the anterior leaflet of the mitral valved (displacement index) to determine if the value is greater than 8mm/m^{2}. Electrocardiographic findings that support the diagnosis often include PR-interval prolongation, tall P waves, varying degrees of right bundle branch block, and an increased prevalence of atrial tachyarrhythmias or accessory pathways such as Wolff–Parkinson–White syndrome.

== Treatment ==
=== Medication ===
Ebstein's cardio physiology typically presents as an (antidromic) AV reentrant tachycardia with associated pre-excitation. In this setting, the preferred medication treatment agent is procainamide. Since AV-blockade may promote conduction over the accessory pathway, drugs such as beta blockers, calcium channel blockers, and digoxin are contraindicated.

If atrial fibrillation with pre-excitation occurs, treatment options include procainamide, flecainide, propafenone, dofetilide, and ibutilide, since these medications slow conduction in the accessory pathway causing the tachycardia and should be administered before considering electrical cardioversion. Intravenous amiodarone may also convert atrial fibrillation and/or slow the ventricular response.

=== Surgery ===
The Canadian Cardiovascular Society (CCS) recommends surgical intervention for these indications:

- Limited exercise capacity (NYHA III-IV)
- Increasing heart size (cardiothoracic ratio greater than 65%)
- Important cyanosis (resting oxygen saturation less than 90% - level B)
- Severe tricuspid regurgitation with symptoms
- Transient ischemic attack or stroke

The CCS further recommends patients who require operation for Ebstein's anomaly should be operated on by congenital heart surgeons who have substantial specific experience and success with this operation. Every effort should be made to preserve the native tricuspid valve.

== History ==
Ebstein's anomaly was named after Wilhelm Ebstein, who in 1866 described the heart of the 19-year-old patient Joseph Prescher. Joseph Prescher was cyanotic with dyspnea, palpitations, jugular venous distension, and cardiomegaly. At autopsy, “Ebstein described an enlarged and fenestrated anterior leaflet of the tricuspid valve.” In addition, “the posterior and septal leaflets were hypoplastic, thickened, and adherent to the right ventricle. There was also a thinned and dilated atrialized portion of the right ventricle, an enlarged right atrium, and a patent foramen ovale.”
