= Czermak–Hering test =

- Example of massage location
- Purpose: test for autonomic nervous function

The Czermak–Hering test is a vagal maneuver consisting of the application of external digital pressure to the carotid sinus. The test is performed at the patient's bedside by imposing moderate pressure with the fingers, repeatedly massaging the left or the right carotid arteries.

== Effects ==
The Czermak–Hering test is a test for autonomic nervous function (vasovagal response), exerting:

- Bradycardia
- Hypotension
- Decrease of blood flow in the brachial artery
- Alterations in the blood flow in the internal carotid artery

== Physiology ==
Johann Nepomuk Czermak stated that mechanical compression of the carotid artery due to the carotid sinus reflex initiates a stimulus of the heart inhibitory branches of the vagus nerve.

== See also ==
- Carotid sinus massage
