= Wolff–Parkinson–White syndrome =

Abnormal heart rhythm due to faulty electrical connections in the heart

- Other names: WPW pattern, Ventricular pre-excitation with arrhythmia, auriculoventricular accessory pathway syndrome
- Conduction through the accessory pathway results in a delta wave.
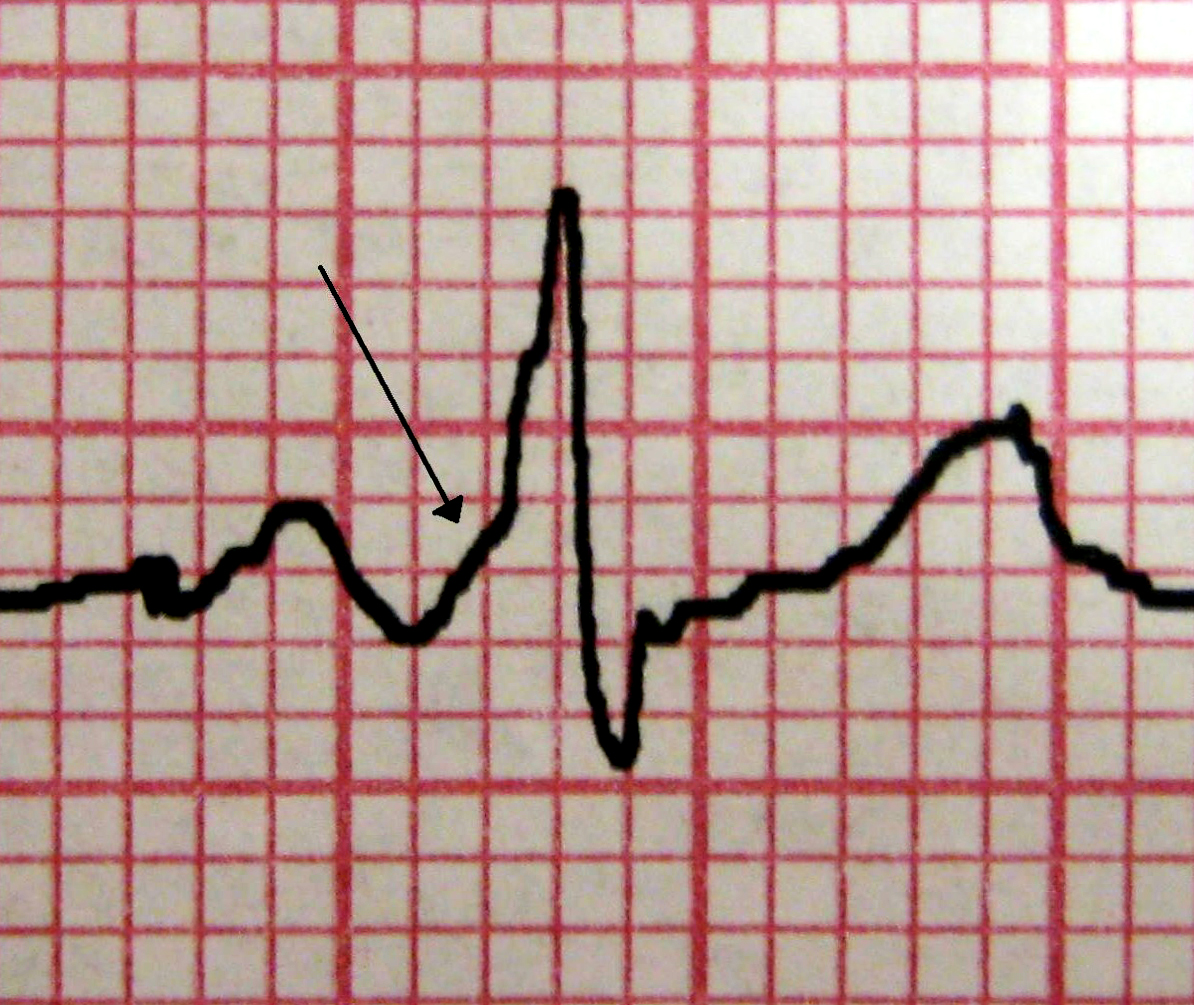
- A characteristic "delta wave" (arrow) seen in a person with Wolff–Parkinson–White syndrome. Note the short PR interval.
- Specialty: Cardiology
- Symptoms: Abnormally fast heartbeat, palpitations, shortness of breath, lightheadedness, loss of consciousness
- Complications: Cardiomyopathy, stroke, sudden cardiac death
- Usual onset: Birth
- Causes: Accessory pathway in the heart
- Diagnostic method: Electrocardiogram shows a short PR interval and a wide QRS complex from a delta wave
- Treatment: Watchful waiting, medications, radiofrequency catheter ablation
- Prognosis: Without symptoms 0.5% (children), 0.1% (adults) risk of death per year
- Frequency: 0.2%

Wolff–Parkinson–White syndrome (WPWS) is a disorder due to a specific type of problem with the electrical system of the heart involving an accessory pathway able to conduct electrical current between the atria and the ventricles, thus bypassing the atrioventricular node. About 60% of people with the electrical problem develop symptoms, which may include an abnormally fast heartbeat, palpitations, shortness of breath, lightheadedness, or syncope. Rarely, cardiac arrest may occur. The most common type of arrhythmia (abnormal heart rate) associated with WPWS is paroxysmal supraventricular tachycardia.

The cause of WPW is typically unknown and is likely due to a combination of chance and genetic factors. A small number of cases are due to a mutation of the PRKAG2 gene which may be inherited in an autosomal dominant fashion. The underlying mechanism involves an accessory electrical conduction pathway between the atria and the ventricles. It is associated with other conditions such as Ebstein anomaly and hypokalemic periodic paralysis. The diagnosis of WPW occurs with a combination of palpitations and when an electrocardiogram (ECG) show a short PR interval and a delta wave. It is a type of pre-excitation syndrome.

WPW syndrome may be monitored or treated with either medications or an ablation (destroying the tissues) such as with radiofrequency catheter ablation. It affects between 0.1 and 0.3% in the population. The risk of death in those without symptoms is about 0.5% per year in children and 0.1% per year in adults. In some cases, non-invasive monitoring may help to more carefully risk stratify patients into a lower risk category. In those without symptoms ongoing observation may be reasonable. In those with WPW complicated by atrial fibrillation, cardioversion or the medication procainamide may be used. The condition is named after Louis Wolff, John Parkinson, and Paul Dudley White who described the ECG findings in 1930.

== Signs and symptoms ==
People with WPW are usually asymptomatic when not having a fast heart rate. However, individuals may experience palpitations, dizziness, shortness of breath, or infrequently syncope (fainting or near fainting) during episodes of supraventricular tachycardia. WPW is also associated with a very small risk of sudden death due to more dangerous heart rhythm disturbances.

== Pathophysiology ==
Graphic representation of the electrical conduction system of the human heart

Transmission of a cardiac action potential through the conduction system of the normal human heart

Electrical activity in the normal human heart begins when a cardiac action potential arises in the sinoatrial (SA) node, which is located in the right atrium. From there, the electrical stimulus is transmitted via internodal pathways to the atrioventricular (AV) node. After a brief delay at the AV node, the stimulus travels through the bundle of His to the left and right bundle branches and then to the Purkinje fibers and the endocardium at the apex of the heart, then finally to the ventricular myocardium.

The AV node serves an important function as a "gatekeeper", limiting the electrical activity that reaches the ventricles. In situations where the atria generate excessively rapid electrical activity (such as atrial fibrillation or atrial flutter), the AV node limits the number of signals conducted to the ventricles. For example, if the atria are electrically activated at 300 beats per minute, half those electrical impulses may be blocked by the AV node, so that the ventricles are stimulated at only 150 beats per minute – resulting in a pulse of 150 beats per minute. Another important property of the AV node is that it slows down individual electrical impulses. This is manifested on the electrocardiogram as the PR interval (the time from electrical activation of the atria to electrical activation of the ventricles), which is usually shortened to less than 120 milliseconds in duration.

Individuals with WPW have an accessory pathway that communicates between the atria and the ventricles, in addition to the AV node. This accessory pathway is known as the bundle of Kent. This accessory pathway does not share the rate-slowing properties of the AV node and may conduct electrical activity at a significantly higher rate than the AV node. For instance, in the example above, if an individual had an atrial rate of 300 beats per minute, the accessory bundle may conduct all the electrical impulses from the atria to the ventricles, causing the ventricles to contract at 300 beats per minute. Extremely rapid heart rates such as this may result in hemodynamic instability or cardiogenic shock. In some cases, the combination of an accessory pathway and abnormal heart rhythms can trigger ventricular fibrillation, a leading cause of sudden cardiac death.

WPW may be associated with PRKAG2, a protein kinase enzyme encoded by the PRKAG2 gene.

=== Bundle of Kent ===
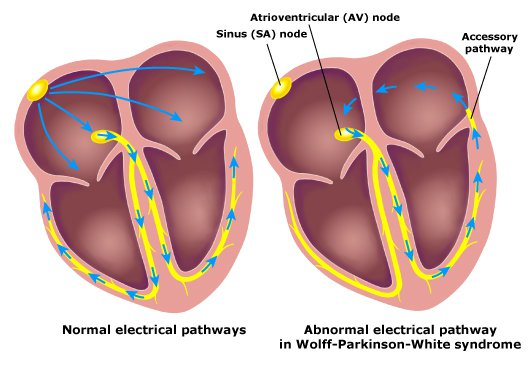
Graphic representation of the bundle of Kent in Wolff–Parkinson–White syndrome

The bundle of Kent is an abnormal extra or accessory conduction pathway between the atria and ventricles that is present in a small percentage (between 0.1 and 0.3%) of the general population. This pathway may communicate between the left atrium and the left ventricle, in which case it is termed a "type A pre-excitation", or between the right atrium and the right ventricle, in which case it is termed a "type B pre-excitation" in old, currently abandoned classification. Problems arise when this pathway creates an electrical circuit that bypasses the AV node. The AV node is capable of slowing the rate of conduction of electrical impulses to the ventricles, whereas the bundle of Kent lacks this capability. When an aberrant electrical connection is made via the bundle of Kent, tachydysrhythmias may therefore result.

== Diagnosis ==
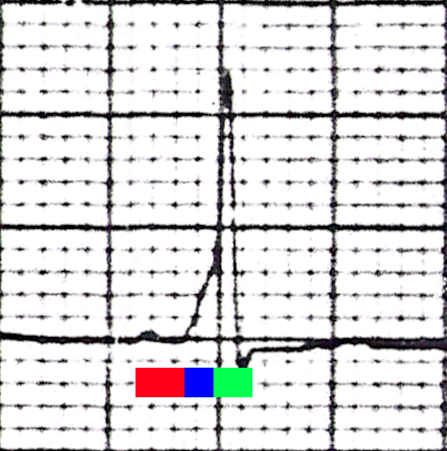
One beat from a rhythm strip in V_{2} demonstrating characteristic findings in Wolff–Parkinson–White syndrome. A characteristic delta wave (above the blue bar), a short PR interval (red bar) of 80 ms, and a long QRS complex (blue bar plus green bar) at 120 ms are visible.

WPW is commonly diagnosed on the basis of the electrocardiogram in an asymptomatic individual. In this case, it is manifested as a delta wave, which is a slurred upstroke in the QRS complex that is associated with a short PR interval. The short PR interval and slurring of the QRS complex are reflective of the impulse making it to the ventricles early (via the accessory pathway) without the usual delay experienced in the AV node.

If a person with WPW experiences episodes of atrial fibrillation, the ECG shows a rapid polymorphic wide-complex tachycardia (without torsades de pointes). This combination of atrial fibrillation and WPW is considered dangerous, and most antiarrhythmic drugs are contraindicated.

When an individual is in normal sinus rhythm, the ECG characteristics of WPW are a short PR interval (less than 120 milliseconds in duration), widened QRS complex (greater than 120 milliseconds in duration) with slurred upstroke of the QRS complex, and secondary repolarization changes (reflected in ST segment-T wave changes).

In individuals with WPW, electrical activity that is initiated in the SA node travels through the accessory pathway, as well as through the AV node to activate the ventricles via both pathways. Since the accessory pathway does not have the impulse slowing properties of the AV node, the electrical impulse first activates the ventricles via the accessory pathway, and immediately afterwards via the AV node. This gives the short PR interval and slurred upstroke of the QRS complex known as the delta wave.

In case of type A pre-excitation (left atrioventricular connections), a positive R wave is seen in V1 ("positive delta") on the precordial leads of the electrocardiogram, while in type B pre-excitation (right atrioventricular connections), a predominantly negative delta wave is seen in lead V1 ("negative delta").

People with WPW may have more than one accessory pathway – in some cases, as many as eight abnormal pathways have been found. This has been seen in individuals with Ebstein's anomaly.

Wolff–Parkinson–White syndrome is sometimes associated with Leber's hereditary optic neuropathy, a form of mitochondrial disease.

=== Risk stratification ===
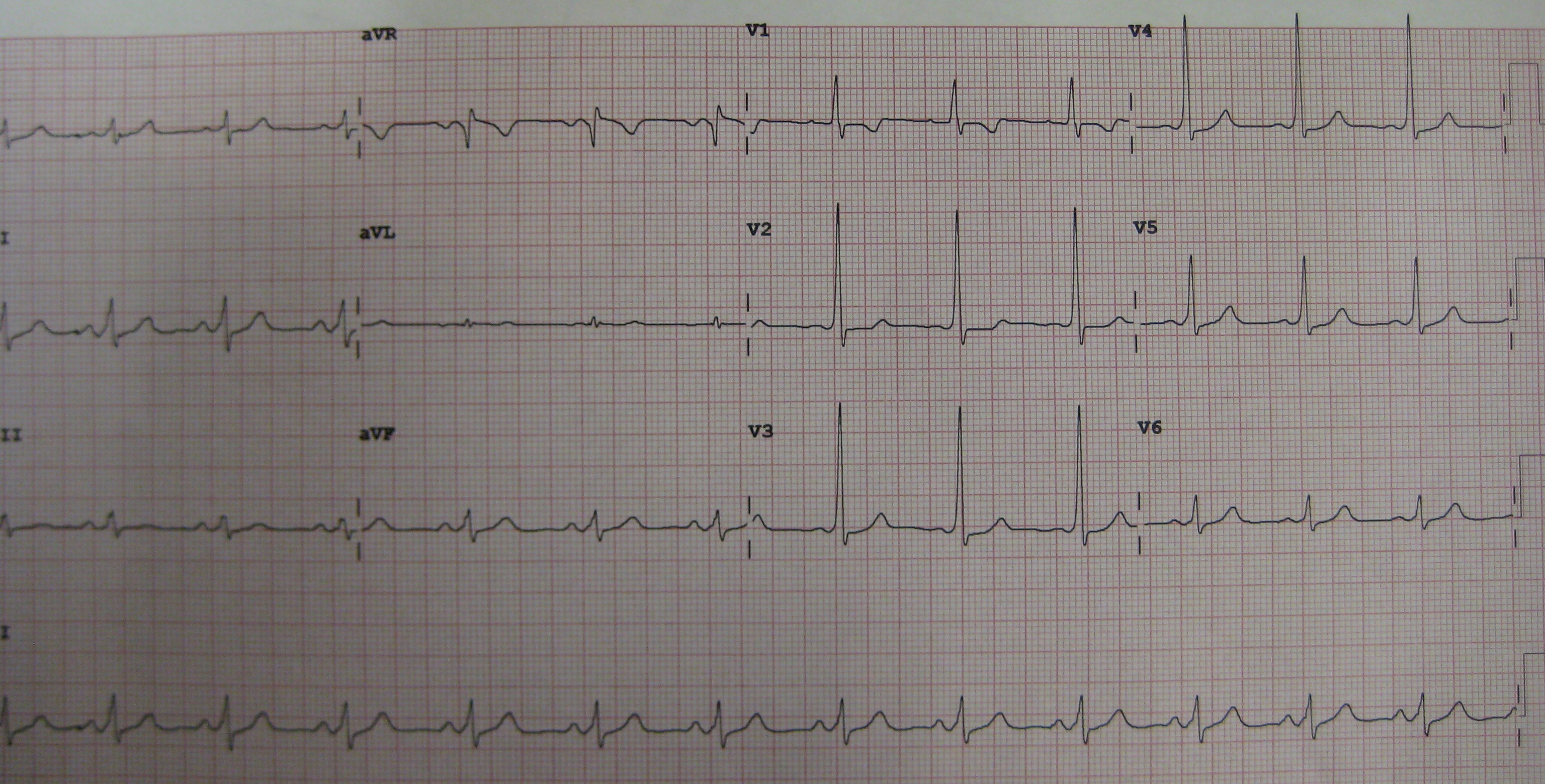
12 lead electrocardiogram of an individual with Wolff–Parkinson–White syndrome

WPW carries a small risk of sudden death, presumably due to rapidly conducted atrial fibrillation causing ventricular fibrillation. While the overall risk is approximately 2.4 per 1000 person years, the risk in an individual is dependent on the properties of the accessory pathway causing pre-excitation.

A higher risk accessory pathway may be suggested by a history of syncope, but risk stratification is best performed by assessing how frequently a pathway can conduct impulse to the ventricles, usually via programmed electrical stimulation (PES) in the cardiac electrophysiology laboratory. This is an invasive but generally low-risk procedure during which the atria are stimulated to try to induce tachycardia. If a tachycardia involving the accessory pathway can be triggered, the cardiologist can then assess how rapidly the accessory pathway is able to conduct. The faster it can conduct, the higher the likelihood the accessory pathway can conduct fast enough to trigger a lethal tachycardia.

High-risk features that may be present during PES include an effective refractory period of the accessory pathway less than 250 ms, multiple pathways, septal location of pathway, and inducibility of supraventricular tachycardia (AVRT, atrial fibrillation). Individuals with any of these high-risk features are generally considered at increased risk for SCD or symptomatic tachycardia, and should be treated accordingly (i.e.: catheter ablation).

It is unclear whether invasive risk stratification (with PES) is necessary in the asymptomatic individual. While some groups advocate PES for risk stratification in all individuals under 35 years old, others only offer it to individuals who have history suggestive of a tachydysrhythmia, since the incidence of sudden cardiac death is so low (less than 0.6% in some reports).

Other methods of risk stratification include observing the ventricular rate during spontaneous atrial fibrillation on a 12-lead ECG. RR intervals of less than 250 ms suggest a higher risk pathway. During exercise testing, abrupt loss of pre-excitation as heart rate increases also suggest a lower risk pathway. However, this approach is hampered by the normal improvement in AV node conduction during exercise which can also mask pre-excitation despite ongoing conduction down the accessory pathway.

== Treatment ==
According to the ACLS protocol, patients with WPW who become symptomatic with a supraventricular tachycardia (SVT) with hemodynamic instability (along with a heart rate (HR) > 150 bpm during the SVT episode and the abnormal heart rhythm seen on a current ECG, hemodynamic instability is defined as hypotension with a systolic blood pressure (SBP) < 90 mm Hg or a rather-sudden drop in the SBP by > 40 mm Hg; other symptoms may include chest pain, palpitations, shortness of breath (SOB), confusion, delayed capillary refill, acute drop in urinary output (oliguria), lethargy with a change in mentation, or altered mental status and disorientation) require emergency use of an automated external defibrillator (AED) for prompt electrical synchronized cardioversion. This may bring the patient back into a normal sinus rhythm and/or prevent further decompensation, cardiac arrest, and mortality.

If the WPW patient is symptomatic but hemodynamically stable, antiarrhythmic drugs (e.g., amiodarone or procainamide) would instead be considered, being likely to chemically convert the patient back into normal sinus rhythm.

=== Medications ===
WPW pattern with hemodynamically stability and orthodromic AVRT leading to a regular narrow complex tachycardia may be managed similarly to other regular narrow complex supraventricular tachycardias: first with vagal maneuvers followed by a trial of adenosine (first-line therapy). The 2015 ACC/AHA/HRS guidelines recommend beta-blockers or calcium channel blockers as second-line agents, electric cardioversion is reserved for refractory arrhythmias. However, if there is any doubt about the diagnosis of orthodromic AVRT or if aberrant conduction leading to a wide complex QRS is observed, it may be prudent to manage as undifferentiated wide complex tachycardia.

People with atrial fibrillation and rapid ventricular response may be treated with amiodarone or procainamide to stabilize their heart rate. Procainamide and cardioversion are accepted treatments for conversion of tachycardia found with WPW. Amiodarone in atrial fibrillation with WPW, is linked to ventricular fibrillation, and thus may be worse than procainamide.

AV node blockers should be avoided in atrial fibrillation and atrial flutter with WPW or history of it; this includes adenosine, diltiazem, verapamil, other calcium channel blockers, and beta blockers. They can exacerbate the syndrome by blocking the heart's normal electrical pathway (therefore favoring 1:1 atrial to ventricle conduction through the pre-excitation pathway, potentially leading to unstable ventricular arrhythmias).

=== Catheter ablation ===
The definitive treatment of WPW is the destruction of the abnormal electrical pathway by catheter ablation. Two main types of catheter ablation include radiofrequency ablation with heat or cryoablation with cold energy. This procedure is performed by cardiac electrophysiologists and has high success rate in the hands of an experienced electrophysiologist. Findings from 1994 indicate success rates of as high as 95% in people treated with radiofrequency catheter ablation for WPW. If radiofrequency catheter ablation is successfully performed, the condition is generally considered cured. Recurrence rates are typically less than 5% after a successful ablation. Some patients, such as ones with underlying Ebstein's anomaly and inherited cardiomyopathies, may have multiple accessory pathways.

== History ==
The bundle of Kent is eponymously named for British physiologist Albert Frank Stanley Kent (1863–1958), who described lateral branches in the atrioventricular groove of the monkey heart (erroneously believing these constituted the normal atrioventricular conduction system).

In 1915, Frank Norman Wilson (1890–1952) became the first to describe the condition later called Wolff–Parkinson–White syndrome. Alfred M. Wedd (1887–1967) was the next to describe the condition in 1921. Cardiologists Louis Wolff (1898–1972), John Parkinson (1885–1976) and Paul Dudley White (1886–1973) are credited with the definitive description of the disorder in 1930.

== Notable cases ==
- LaMarcus Aldridge, American basketball player
- Michael Cera, Canadian actor
- Jonathon Cooper, American football player
- Charley Crockett, American musician and actor
- Max Duggan, American football player
- Nathan Eagleton, former Australian rules football player
- Jeff Garlin, American actor, writer, and comedian
- Quentin Groves, American football player who died of a heart attack at age 32
- Dan Hardy, British UFC welterweight fighter, turned analyst and commentator
- Alicia Hoskin, New Zealand Olympic canoeist.
- Mitch Hurwitz, American television writer and producer, creator of Arrested Development
- Jessie J, British musician
- Marilyn Manson, American musician, painter, and actor
- Meat Loaf, American musician
- Michael Montgomery, American football player
- Montel Vontavious Porter, professional wrestler
- Michael Rupp, American ice hockey player

== See also ==
- Re-entry ventricular arrhythmia
