= Multifocal atrial tachycardia =

Fast heart rhythm associated with exacerbations of COPD

- Other names: Chaotic atrial tachycardia
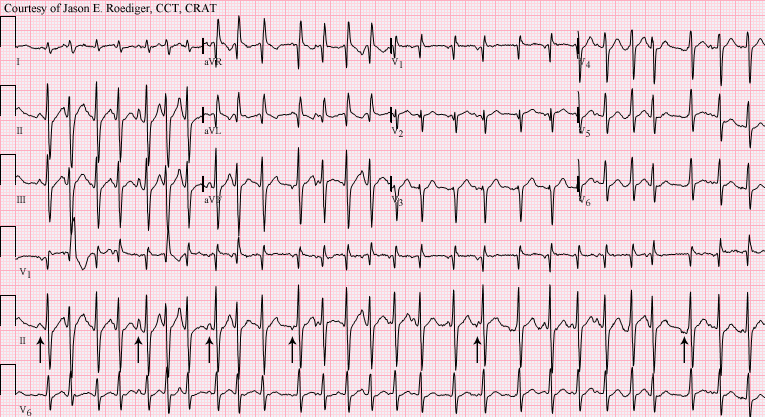
- Multifocal atrial tachycardia
- Specialty: Cardiology

Multifocal (or multiform) atrial tachycardia (MAT) is an abnormal heart rhythm, specifically a type of supraventricular tachycardia, that is particularly common in older people and is associated with exacerbations of chronic obstructive pulmonary disease (COPD). Normally, the heart rate is controlled by a cluster of pacemaker cells called the sinoatrial node (SA node). When different clusters of cells known as ectopic pacemakers, that are outside the SA node take over control of the heart rate, and the rate exceeds 100 beats per minute, this is called multifocal atrial tachycardia. A fast heart rate below 100, is technically not a tachycardia and is then termed multifocal atrial rhythm, also known as wandering atrial tachycardia.

"Multiform" refers to the observation of variable P wave shapes, while "multifocal" refers to the underlying cause. Although these terms are used interchangeably, some sources prefer "multiform" since it does not presume any underlying mechanism.

== Causes ==
MAT usually arises because of an underlying medical condition. Its prevalence has been estimated at 3 per 1000 in adult hospital inpatients and is much rarer in paediatric practice; it is more common in the elderly, and its management and prognosis are both those of the underlying diagnosis.

It is mostly common in patients with lung disorders, but it can occur after acute myocardial infarction and can also occur in the setting of low blood potassium or low blood magnesium.

It is sometimes associated with digitalis toxicity in patients with heart disease.

It is most commonly associated with hypoxia and COPD. Additionally, it can be caused by theophylline toxicity, a drug with a narrow therapeutic index commonly used to treat COPD. Theophylline can cause a number of different abnormal heart rhythms when in excess, and thus further predisposes COPD patients to MAT. Theophylline toxicity often occurs following acute or chronic overtreatment or factors lowering its clearance from the body.

== Pathophysiology ==
The P-waves and P–R intervals are variable due to a phenomenon called wandering atrial pacemaker (WAP). The electrical impulse is generated at a different focus within the atria of the heart each time. WAP is positive once the heart generates at least three different P-wave formations from the same ECG lead. Then, if the heart rate exceeds 100 beats per minute, the phenomenon is called multifocal atrial tachycardia.

== Diagnosis ==
Multifocal atrial tachycardia is characterized by an electrocardiogram (ECG) strip with three or more discrete P wave morphologies in the same lead, not including that originating from the sinoatrial node, plus tachycardia, which is a heart rate exceeding 100 beats per minute (although some suggest using a threshold of 90 beats per minute). Furthermore, there should be irregular PP intervals, and the baseline should be isoelectric between P waves. Other findings that are commonly seen, but are not diagnostic include irregular PR and RR intervals. Variation in PR intervals has not been included in the diagnostic criteria because the PR interval varies with the length of the preceding RP interval.

Other diagnoses that may present with similar findings on electrocardiogram that should be included in the differential diagnosis include sinus tachycardia with frequent premature atrial contractions (this would have regular PP intervals), atrial flutter with variable AV node conduction (this would have regular PP intervals and flutter waves), atrial fibrillation (this would not have discrete P-wave morphologies), and wandering atrial pacemaker which would have a heart rate less than 100 beats per minute).

=== Additional workup ===
If arrhythmia persists despite the treatment of underlying medical conditions it may be worth checking a complete blood count and serum chemistry for signs of infection, anemia, or electrolyte abnormalities such as hypokalemia and hypomagnesemia.

== Treatment ==
Management of multifocal atrial tachycardia consists mainly of the treatment of the underlying cause. If treatment is indicated, therapy should begin with first correcting underlying electrolyte abnormalities with the repletion of potassium to maintain greater than 4 mEq/L and magnesium greater than 2 mEq/L. Studies have shown magnesium suppresses ectopic atrial activity and can be beneficial even if magnesium levels are within the normal range. Once electrolyte abnormalities have been corrected, possible treatment options include non-dihydropyridine calcium channel blockers, beta-blockers, and atrioventricular (AV) node ablation. Studies have found no role for antiarrhythmic agents, cardioversion, or anticoagulation. In the absence of underlying pulmonary disease, the first-line agent is beta-blockers. A beta-blockers act to suppress ectopic foci by reducing sympathetic stimulation and decreasing conduction through the atrioventricular node, thereby slowing the ventricular response. Studies have found an average decrease in heart rate of 51 beats per minute and 79% of patients reverted to sinus rhythm. Most patients did not need beta-blocker therapy long term as studies found long-term therapy was needed in only 25% of patients. Caution should be used in patients with an underlying pulmonary disease such as COPD and patients with decompensated heart failure due to the increased risk for bronchospasms and decreased cardiac output. Furthermore, beta-blockers should be avoided in patients with atrioventricular blocks unless a pacemaker has been implanted.

In the presence of underlying pulmonary disease, the first-line agent is a non-dihydropyridine calcium channel blocker such as verapamil or diltiazem. These agents act to suppress atrial rate and decrease conduction through the atrioventricular node, thereby slowing the ventricular rate. Studies have found an average reduction in the ventricular rate of 31 beats per minute and 43% of patients reverted to sinus rhythm. Caution should be used in patients with preexisting heart failure or hypotension due to negative inotropic effects and peripheral vasodilation. Similarly, calcium channel blockers should also be avoided in patients with atrioventricular blocks unless a pacemaker has been implanted.

In select cases of refractory multifocal atrial tachycardia, AV node ablation has been performed. Studies have found an average reduction in the ventricular rate of 56 beats per minute with adequate control of ventricular response in 84% of patients. However, AV node ablation creates a complete heart block and requires the placement of a permanent pacemaker.

Administration of oxygen may play a role in the treatment of some patients.
