= Electrophysiology study =

Medical test to record electrical activity within the heart

- Synonyms: Electrophysiological study, EP study
- Purpose: Diagnose abnormal heart rhythms
- Test of: Electrical activity within the heart

A cardiac electrophysiology study (EP test or EP study) is a minimally invasive procedure using catheters introduced through a vein or artery to record electrical activity from within the heart. This electrical activity is recorded when the heart is in a normal rhythm (sinus rhythm) to assess the conduction system of the heart and to look for additional electrical connections (accessory pathways), and during any abnormal heart rhythms that can be induced. EP studies are used to investigate the cause, location of origin, and best treatment for various abnormal heart rhythms, and are often followed by a catheter ablation during the same procedure.

== Preparation ==
It is important for patients not to eat or drink for up to 12 hours before the procedure. This is to prevent vomiting, which can result in aspiration, and also cause severe bleeding from the insertion site of the catheter. Failure to follow this simple preparation may result in dangerous consequences. In general, small amounts of water can be consumed up to 2 hours before the exam. Patients should try to schedule the exam at a time when they will be having symptoms and will not need to drive for 2 to 3 days.

If the reason for the EP study is for an arrhythmia, then antiarrhythmic drugs may be held to increase the likelihood of being able to induce the rhythm. Additionally, beta blockers or calcium channel blockers may be held as well. Anticoagulants may be held or continued depending on the scenario.

== Procedure ==
An EP study is typically performed in an EP lab (a specialized cath lab). These are specially equipped operating rooms that usually contain:

- an x-ray machine capable of acquiring live X-ray video images (a fluoroscope)
- equipment to record electrical signals from the heart
- a stimulator to electrically excite the heart and control the heart rate
- ablation equipment to destroy abnormal tissue
- an electroanatomic mapping system that tracks and records the catheter position in 3D and associated electrical signals
- ready access to cardiac medications such as adenosine, atropine, dopamine, and isoproterenol
- ready access to an assortment of introducer sheaths and catheters
- surgical instruments for device implants including scalpels, electrocautery, retractors, forceps, hemostats, and scissors

The procedure may be performed awake under local anaesthetic, or under general anaesthetic. Monitoring equipment is attached including an automated blood pressure cuff and a pulse oximeter to measure the oxygen saturation of the blood. A peripheral venous cannula is generally inserted to allow medication to be given such as sedatives, anesthesia, or drugs.

An access site that will allow catheters to be passed to the heart via an artery or vein is shaved and cleaned, usually in the groin. The blood vessels used to reach the heart (the femoral or subclavian veins, and sometimes the femoral artery) are punctured before a guidewire and plastic sheath are inserted into the vessel using the Seldinger technique.

=== EP Study and inducibility ===
Once the catheter is in and all preparations are complete elsewhere in the lab, the EP study begins. The X-ray machine will give the doctor a live view of the heart and the position of the electrodes. He will guide the (steerable) electrodes to the correct position inside the heart. The electrophysiologist begins by moving the electrodes along the conduction pathways and along the inner walls of the heart, measuring the electrical activity along the way.

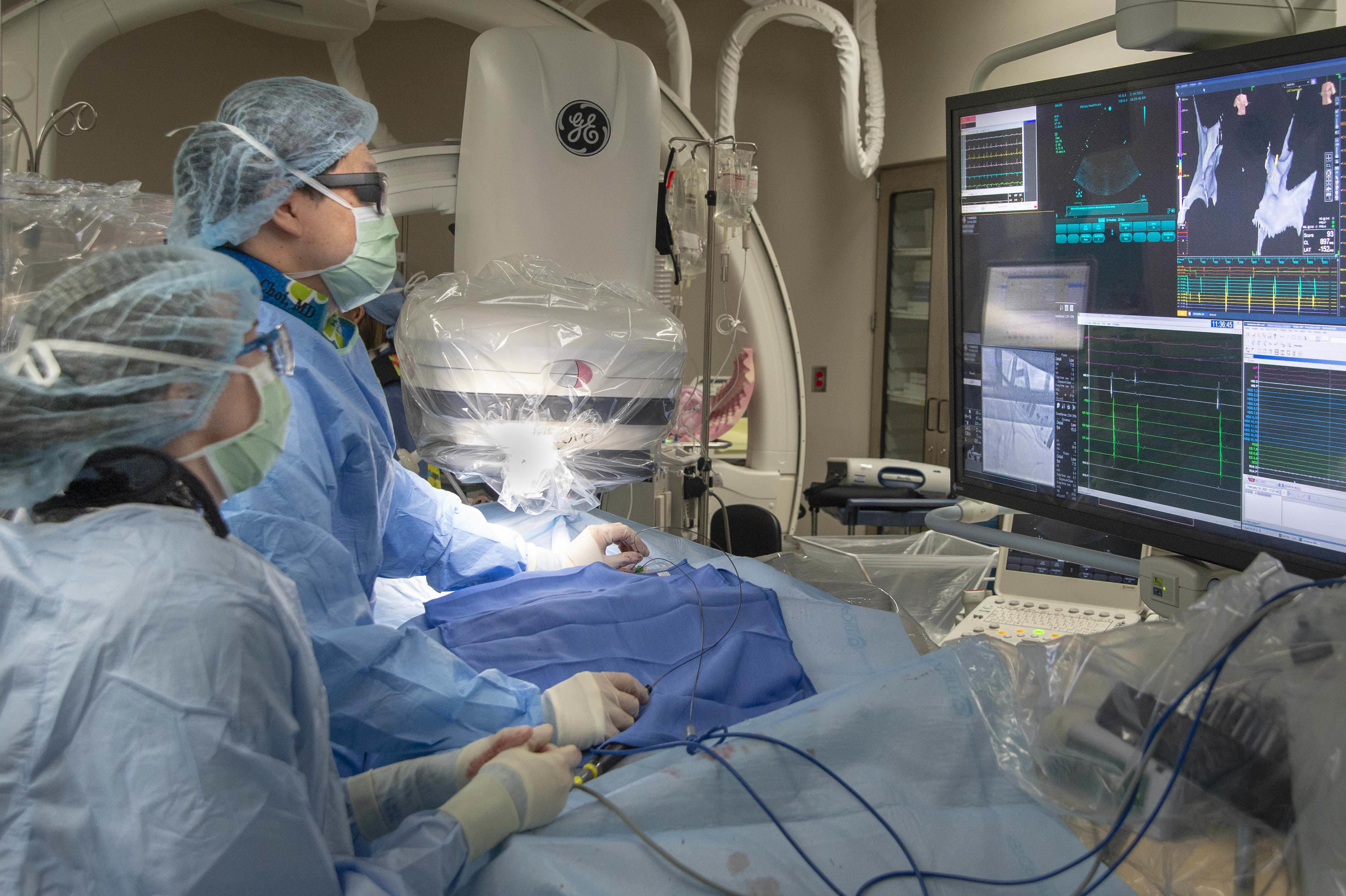
Doctors conduct an electrophysiology study in the hospital's cardiac catheterization laboratory

The next step is pacing the heart, this means he/she will speed up or slow down the heart by placing the electrode at certain points along the conductive pathways of the heart and control the depolarization rate of the heart. The doctor will pace each chamber of the heart one by one, looking for any abnormalities. Then the electrophysiologist tries to provoke arrhythmias and reproduce any conditions that have resulted in the patient's placement in the study. This is done by injecting electric current into the conductive pathways and into the endocardium at various places. Last, the electrophysiologist may administer various drugs (proarrhythmic agents) to induce arrhythmia (inducibility of VT/VF). If the arrhythmia is reproduced by the drugs (inducible), the electrophysiologist will search out the source of the abnormal electrical activity. The entire procedure can take several hours.

=== Ablation ===
If at any step during the EP study the electrophysiologist finds the source of the abnormal electrical activity, they may try to ablate the cells that are misfiring. This is done using high-energy radio frequencies (similar to microwaves) to effectively heat up the abnormal cells, to form scar tissue. This can be painful with pain felt in the heart itself, the neck and shoulder areas. A more recent method of ablation is cryoablation, which is considered less risky and less painful.

== Recovery ==
When the necessary procedures are complete, the catheter is removed. Firm pressure is applied to the site to prevent bleeding. This may be done by hand or with a mechanical device. Other closure techniques include an internal suture and plug. If the femoral artery was used, the patient will probably be asked to lie flat for several hours (3 to 6) to prevent bleeding or the development of a hematoma. Trying to sit up or even lift the head is strongly discouraged until an adequate clot has formed. The patient will be moved to a recovery area where he/she will be monitored.

For patients who had a catheterization at the femoral artery or vein (and even some of those with a radial insertion site), in general recovery is fairly quick, as the only damage is at the insertion site. The patient will probably feel fine within 8 to 12 hours after the procedure, but may feel a small pinch at the insertion site. After a short period of general rest, the patient may resume some minor activity such as gentle, short, slow walks after the first 24 hours. If stairs must be climbed, they should be taken one step at a time and very slowly. All vigorous activity must be postponed until approved by a physician.

It is also important to note that unless directed by a doctor, some patients should avoid taking blood thinners and foods that contain salicylates, such as cranberry-containing products until the clot has healed (1–2 weeks).

=== Complications ===
As with any surgical procedure, cardiac catheterizations come with a generic list of possible complications. One of the complications that are sometimes reported involves some temporary nerve involvement. Sometimes a small amount of swelling occurs that can put pressure on nerves in the area of the incision. Venous thrombosis is the most common complication with an incidence ranging between 0.5 and 2.5%. There have been reports of patients feeling like they have hot fluid like blood or urine running down their leg for up to a month or two after the incision has healed. This usually passes with time, but patients should tell their doctor if they have these symptoms and if they last.

More severe but relatively rare complications include: damage or trauma to a blood vessel, which could require repair; infection from the skin puncture or from the catheter itself; cardiac perforation, causing blood to leak into the sac around the heart and compromising the heart's pumping action, requiring removal using a needle under the breast bone (pericardiocentesis); hematoma at the site(s) of the puncture(s); induction of a dangerous cardiac rhythm requiring an external shock(s); a clot may be dislodged, which may travel to a distant organ and impede blood flow or cause a stroke; myocardial infarction; unanticipated reactions to the medications used during the procedure; damage to the conduction system, requiring a permanent pacemaker; death.

== See also ==
- Electrocardiogram (ECG or EKG)
- Electrical conduction system of the heart
- Ventricular tachycardia
- Arrhythmia
- Antiarrhythmic agents
