= Catheter ablation =

Removal or termination of an electrical pathway from parts of the heart

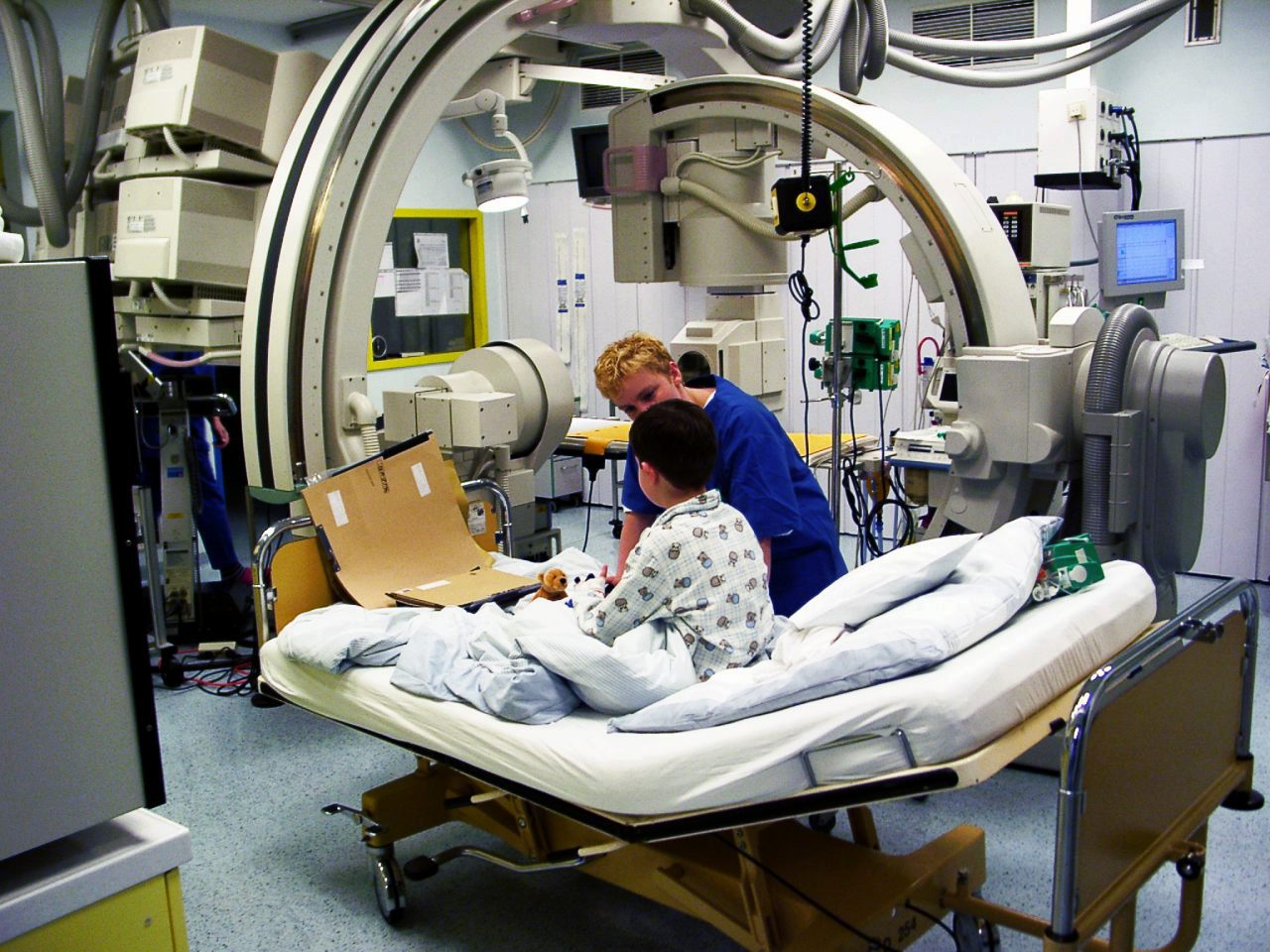
- ICD-9-CM: 37.34
- MeSH: D017115

Catheter ablation is a procedure that uses radio-frequency energy or other sources to terminate or modify a faulty electrical pathway from sections of the heart of those who are prone to developing cardiac arrhythmias such as atrial fibrillation, atrial flutter and Wolff-Parkinson-White syndrome. If not controlled, such arrhythmias increase the risk of ventricular fibrillation and sudden cardiac arrest. The ablation procedure can be classified by energy source: radiofrequency ablation and cryoablation.

== Medical uses ==
Catheter ablation may be recommended for a recurrent or persistent arrhythmia resulting in symptoms or other dysfunction. Atrial fibrillation frequently results from bursts of tachycardia that originate in muscle bundles extending from the atrium to the pulmonary veins. Pulmonary vein isolation by transcatheter ablation can restore sinus rhythm.

=== Effectiveness ===
Catheter ablation of most arrhythmias has a high success rate. Success rates for Wolff–Parkinson–White syndrome (WPW) have been as high as 95% For supraventricular tachycardia (SVT), single procedure success is 91% to 96% (95% Confidence Interval) and multiple procedure success is 92% to 97% (95% Confidence Interval). For atrial flutter, single procedure success is 88% to 95% (95% Confidence Interval) and multiple procedure success is 95% to 99% (95% Confidence Interval). For automatic atrial tachycardias, the success rates are 70–90%. The potential complications include bleeding, blood clots, pericardial tamponade, and heart block, but these risks are very low, ranging from 2.6 to 3.2%.

For non-paroxysmal atrial fibrillation, a 2016 systematic review compared catheter ablation to heart rhythm drugs. After 12 months, participants receiving catheter ablation were more likely to be free of atrial fibrillation, and less likely to need cardioversion. However, the evidence quality ranged from moderate to very low A 2006 study, including both paroxysmal and non-paroxysmal atrial fibrillation, found that the success rates are 28% for single procedures. Often, several procedures are needed to raise the success rate to a 70–80% range. One reason for this may be that once the heart has undergone atrial remodeling as in the case of chronic atrial fibrillation patients, largely 50 and older, it is much more difficult to correct the 'bad' electrical pathways. Young people with AF with paroxysmal, or intermittent, AF therefore have an increased chance of success with an ablation since their heart has not undergone atrial remodeling yet. Several experienced teams of electrophysiologists in US heart centers claim they can achieve up to a 75% success rate.

Pulmonary vein isolation has been found to be more effective than optimized antiarrhythmic drug therapy for improving quality of life at 12 months after treatment.

Catheter ablation has been found to improve mental health outcomes in individuals with symptomatic atrial fibrillation.

A 2018 study showed efficacy of cardiac ablation for treatment of Premature Ventricular Contraction as 94.1%.

== Technique ==
Catheter ablation is usually performed by an electrophysiologist (a specially trained cardiologist) in a cath lab.

Catheter ablation procedure involves advancing several flexible catheters into the patient's blood vessels, usually either in the femoral vein, Internal jugular vein, or subclavian vein. The catheters are then advanced towards the heart. The catheters have electrodes at the tips that can measure the electrical signals from the heart. These electrodes create a map of the abnormal pathways causing arrhythmias. Then, the electrophysiologist uses the map to identify areas from which abnormal heart rhythms originate.

Once the abnormal areas are located, catheters are used to deliver energy via local heating or freezing to ablate (destroy) the abnormal tissue that is causing the arrhythmia. The energy is applied cautiously to avoid damaging healthy heart tissue. Originally, a DC impulse was used to create lesions in the intra-cardiac conduction system. However, due to a high incidence of complications, widespread use was never achieved.

In contrast to the thermal methods (extreme heat or cold) electroporation is being used and evaluated as a means of killing very small areas of heart muscle. The cardiac catheter delivers trains of high-voltage ultra-rapid electrical pulses that form irreversible pores in cell membranes, resulting in cell death of cardiac muscle, while not killing adjacent tissues (esophagus and phrenic nerve). It is thought to allow better selectivity than the previous thermal techniques, which used heat or cold to kill larger volumes of muscle.

One type of catheter ablation is pulmonary vein isolation, where the ablation is done in the left atrium in the area where the 4 pulmonary veins connect. Radiofrequency ablation for atrial fibrillation can be unipolar (one electrode) or bipolar (two electrodes). Although bipolar can be more successful, it is technically more difficult, resulting in unipolar being used more often. But bipolar is more effective in preventing recurrent atrial arrhythmias.

During the procedure, the patient's heart rhythm is monitored continuously. The electrophysiologist can observe changes to the patient's cardiac electrical activity to determine the success of the ablation. If the cardiac rhythm shows no abnormal signals or arrhythmias, the catheters are withdrawn from the heart and the incision is closed.

== Epicardial ablation ==
For patients for whom catheter ablations fail, they may then have an epicardial ablation performed. In this type of ablation, instead of a catheter being threaded through a vein in the groin area, the "most direct and safest route to the space outside the heart" is used by going into the subxiphoid region - just under the breastbone at the bottom of the rib cage.

A needle then enters the pericardial space around the heart, where then a wire is inserted, the needle is removed, and a plastic tube is inserted over the wire. That tube is then where the ablation catheter is threaded to then burn off the offending area of the heart. Following epicardial ablation, often a small plastic tube may be left in place overnight to drain any fluid that may accumulate in the pericardial space.

At most centers, epicardial ablation is not usually performed, but it is at "selected centers" such as Stanford.

== Recovery or rehabilitation ==
After catheter ablation the patients are moved to a cardiac recovery unit, intensive care unit, or cardiovascular intensive care unit where they are not allowed to move for 4–6 hours. Minimizing movement helps prevent bleeding from the site of catheter insertion. Some people have to stay overnight for observation, some need to stay much longer and others are able to go home on the same day. This all depends on the problem, the length of the operation and whether or not general anaesthetic was used.

=== Blanking period ===
Recurrence of atrial fibrillation within three months of an ablation is seen in most patients, but many of those patients become free of atrial fibrillation in the long term. For this reason the first three months after an ablation are described as the blanking period, during which no further intervention is to be attempted.

In 35 to 65 percent of all cases, atrial arrhythmias occur within the first three months after ablation. If this is the case in the first month, it is a particular indication of possible late recurrences.

The early recurrences of arrhythmias such as atrial fibrillation, atrial flutter, left atrial (arising from the left atrium) tachycardia are abbreviated as ERAT in the medical literature. They are considered temporary and benign and occur in up to 40 percent of patients. However, half of this group with symptomatic ERAT after ablation will relapse.

Research has shown that ERAT primarily occurs within the first two weeks after ablation. Tissue edema after ablation disappears within a month. That is why a three-month blanking period has been criticized because it appears to be too long. A period of four weeks after surgical or transcatheteral ablations is considered to be more sensible.

According to the latest studies, arrhythmia recurrences that occur in the first few weeks after catheter ablation for atrial fibrillation are not necessarily considered a failure of the procedure. It is assumed that such early recurrences, in contrast to late recurrences, are caused by temporary local inflammatory reactions in the atrium as a result of the procedure and heal on their own. However, a study by Korean cardiologists showed that in almost 70 percent of the cases examined, early recurrences were also followed by late recurrences.

Recurrence during the nine months following the blanking period, occurs in 25% to 40% of patients, the variability greatly affected by obesity and the severity of atrial fibrillation before the ablation.

== Medication after ablation ==
Despite ablation, medication often cannot be avoided. Studies show that around 30 to 40 percent of participants continue to be treated with antiarrhythmic drugs despite atrial fibrillation ablation, which is due, among other things, to the early recurrences that occur during the blanking period, which are caused by local inflammatory reactions in the atrium. Such early recurrences can be prevented by using antiarrhythmic drugs. However, the benefit of such therapy is questionable, particularly if it continues beyond the blanking period. Anticoagulation after atrial fibrillation ablation has been rigorously studied in randomized clinical trials and meta-analyses. The American College of Cardiology, American Heart Association, and Heart Rhythm Society recommend uninterrupted direct oral anticoagulants (DOACs) or vitamin K antagonists (VKAs) during the periprocedural period, as uninterrupted therapy reduces both thromboembolic and bleeding complications compared to interrupted regimens.

== Complications ==
Some potential complications associated with the procedure include:

- Bleeding - catheter insertion into arteries or veins can cause bleeding at the insertion site.
- Blood vessel damage - insertion of the catheter can also damage the blood vessels and lead to hematoma, which is a collection of blood outside the blood vessels, or vessel perforation.
- Infection - infections can occur at the catheter insertion site or in the heart tissue. Patients require additional treatment if infection is a complication.
- Blood clots - catheterization can cause blood clots to form in the vessels. These clots can be thrombotic, possibly causing embolism in major organs.
- Pericardial effusion - the ablation procedure can irritate the heart tissue and lead to accumulation of fluid under the pericardium (lining of the heart).
- Cardiac tamponade - Similarly, if greater amounts of fluid accumulate around the heart due to irritation of the heart tissue, it can put pressure on the heart leading to tamponade. This is a serious condition as it affects the heart's ability to pump blood to the body and thus requires immediate intervention.
- Arrhythmia - the ablation procedure can result in a new rhythm disturbance in the heart.
- Pulmonary vein stenosis - a rare complication caused by scarring in the pulmonary vein.

Patients may also experience a return of the arrhythmia after the procedure, requiring them to undergo further treatment. However, in general this procedure is considered a safe, effective, and minimally invasive method to treat arrhythmias. Studies have shown that the overall complication rate of cardiac ablation procedures is about 6%.
