= Instruments used in urology =

Instruments used in urology are specialized medical devices employed in the diagnosis, treatment, and surgical management of disorders affecting the urinary tract and the male reproductive system. Urological instruments are used in both open and minimally invasive procedures, including endoscopy, catheterization, stone removal, tissue resection, and reconstructive surgery. Commonly used instruments include cystoscopes, ureteroscopes, resectoscopes (cytoscopes equipped with a cauterization loop), dilators, catheters, and lithotripsy devices.

The development of modern urological instrumentation closely paralleled advances in urology and minimally invasive surgery during the 19th and 20th centuries. Early innovations such as the cystoscope enabled direct visualization of the bladder and urethra, while later fiber-optic and digital technologies expanded the use of endoscopic techniques throughout the urinary tract.

Urological instruments may be reusable or disposable and are commonly manufactured from stainless steel, polymers, and fiber-optic materials designed to withstand sterilization and repeated clinical use.

== Instrument list ==
Instrument	Uses
General instruments used in adult medicine are used in this branch of medicine	
Ultrasonic stone disintegration apparatus	used to break down kidney stones into smaller fragments to allow them to pass out without the need of any surgery
Cystoscope	an endoscope to view the urinary passage
Urethral sound	instrument used to dilate urethra and relieve urethral strictures
Ureteric balloon catheter	a balloon catheter intended for treating strictures of the ureter

== See also ==
- List of surgical instruments
- Instruments used in internal medicine
