= Obstructive uropathy =

Blockage of urine flow

- Specialty: Urology

Obstructive uropathy is a structural or functional hindrance of normal urine flow, sometimes leading to renal dysfunction (obstructive nephropathy).

It is a very broad term, and does not imply a location or cause.

== Presentation ==
Symptoms, less likely in chronic obstruction, are pain radiating to the T11 to T12 dermatomes, anuria, nocturia, or polyuria.

== Causes ==
It can be caused by a lesion at any point in the urinary tract.

Causes include urolithiasis, posterior urethral valves and ureteral herniation.

== Diagnosis ==
Diagnosis is based on results of bladder catheterization, ultrasonography, CT scan, cystourethroscopy, or pyelography, depending on the level of obstruction.

== Treatment ==
Treatment, depending on cause, may require prompt drainage of the bladder via catheterization, medical instrumentation, surgery (e.g., endoscopy, lithotripsy), hormonal therapy, or a combination of these modalities.

Treatment of the obstruction at the level of the ureter:

- Open surgery.
- Less invasive treatment: laparoscopic correction.
- Minimal invasive treatment: Overtoom procedure: dilatation with cutting balloon catheter followed by introduction of the pyeloplasty balloon catheter. This balloon is inflated with pure contrast agent via the pusher and remains in situ in the ureter to keep the previous treated stricture dilated while the expanded urothelium heals. Urine can drain through the central channel of this catheter.
