= Clinical cardiac electrophysiology =

Study of heart disorders

Clinical cardiac electrophysiology (also referred to as cardiac electrophysiology or simply EP) is a branch of the medical specialty of cardiology concerned with the study and treatment of rhythm disorders of the heart. Cardiologists with expertise in this area are usually referred to as electrophysiologists. Electrophysiologists are trained in the mechanism, function, and performance of the electrical activities of the heart. Electrophysiologists work closely with other cardiologists and cardiac surgeons to assist or guide therapy for heart rhythm disturbances (arrhythmias). They are trained to perform interventional and surgical procedures to treat cardiac arrhythmia.

The training required to become an electrophysiologist is lengthy and requires eight years after medical school (in the U.S.), entailing three years of internal medicine residency, three years of clinical cardiology fellowship, and two years of clinical cardiac electrophysiology. This is necessary due to the significant complexity of patients that electrophysiologists usually treat, the constant advances in methods and equipment used in their daily practice, making the field of electrophysiology one of the most demanding subspecialties of modern medicine.

An electrophysiology study is any of a number of invasive (intracardiac) and non-invasive recording of spontaneous electrical activity, as well as of cardiac responses to programmed electrical stimulation. These studies are performed to assess arrhythmias, elucidate symptoms, evaluate abnormal electrocardiograms, assess risk of developing arrhythmias in the future, and design treatment.

In addition to diagnostic testing of the electrical properties of the heart, electrophysiologists are trained in therapeutic and surgical methods to treat many of the rhythm disturbances of the heart. Therapeutic modalities employed in this field include antiarrhythmic drug therapy and surgical implantation of pacemakers and implantable cardioverter-defibrillators.

== Scope of practice, tests and procedures ==
Common rhythms dealt with include atrial fibrillation, ventricular tachycardia, and the supraventricular tachycardias. Abnormal rhythms have multiple ways they can be treated and choosing is often individualized based on symptoms and patient preference.

=== Diagnostic testing ===
Electrophysiologists will commonly employ the following diagnostic tests and may be performed or interpreted exclusively by the electrophysiologist. Other tests such as cardiac stress testing may be included in an evaluation but are not exclusive to electrophysiology.

- Electrocardiogram
- Ambulatory electrocardiographic monitoring (Holter and event monitor recording and interpretation)
- Tilt table testing
- T-wave alternans testing
- Signal-averaged electrocardiogram (SAECG) interpretation, also referred to as "late potentials" reading
- Electrophysiology study (EPS) consists in the insertion of pacing and recording electrodes either in the esophagus (intra-esophageal EPS) or, through blood vessels, directly into the heart chambers (intra-cardiac EPS) in order to measure electrical properties of the heart and, in the case of intra-cardiac EPS, to electrically stimulate it in the attempt to induce arrhythmias for diagnostic purposes ("programmed electrical stimulation"). Frequently, an EPS is combined with an ablation in the same procedure if deemed the appropriate therapy.

=== Medical treatment ===
Initial administration and monitoring of the effect of drugs for treatment of heart rhythm disorders. Electrophysiologists are often involved when severe or life-threatening arrhythmias are being treated, or when multiple drugs must be used to treat an arrhythmia. Antiarrhythmic agents such as flecainide, dofetilide, and amiodarone are commonly used to try to control rhythms.

=== Catheter ablation ===
Ablation therapy is a catheter based ablation of lesions in the heart (with radiofrequency energy, cryotherapy (destructive freezing), microwave, or ultrasound energy) to cure or control arrhythmias (see radiofrequency ablation). Ablation is usually performed during the same procedure as the electrophysiology study during which arrhythmias are attempted to be induced as well as elucidating the mechanism of the arrhythmia for which ablation therapy is sought.

- "Non-complex" ablations include ablation for arrhythmias such as: AV nodal reentrant tachycardia, accessory pathway mediated tachycardia, typical (CTI-dependent) atrial flutter. These procedures are usually performed using intracardiac catheters (as are used during an electrophysiology study), fluoroscopy (a real-time X-ray camera), and electrical recordings from the inside of the heart.
- "Complex" ablations include ablation for arrhythmias such as multifocal atrial tachycardia, atrial fibrillation, and ventricular tachycardia. In addition to the apparatus used for a "non-complex" ablation, these procedures often make use of sophisticated electro-anatomic mapping systems to localize the source of the abnormal rhythm and to direct delivery of ablation lesions. Additionally, most of our current electro-anatomic mapping systems have the ability to integrate CT or MR images of the heart to allow electrical activity to be superimposed on anatomic structures.

=== Surgical procedures: pacemaker and defibrillator implantation and follow up ===
Implantation of devices include

- Single- and dual-chamber pacemakers
- Single- and dual-chamber defibrillators
- "Biventricular" devices for patients with congestive heart failure
- Subcutaneous defibrillators
- Leadless pacemakers
- Loop recorders is an implanted ECG recorders for long-term monitoring of ECG to allow for diagnosis of an arrhythmia
- Left atrial appendage occlusion devices

Additionally, there are, at times, indications to remove these devices and extraction (ie, removal) of these devices can also be performed by electrophysiologists.

Once implanted, long-term clinical follow up and reprogramming of implanted devices also falls to the electrophysiologist.

== See also ==
- Cardiology
- Cardiac arrhythmia
- Cardiac electrophysiology
- Electroanatomic mapping
