= Balloon septostomy =

Medical procedure

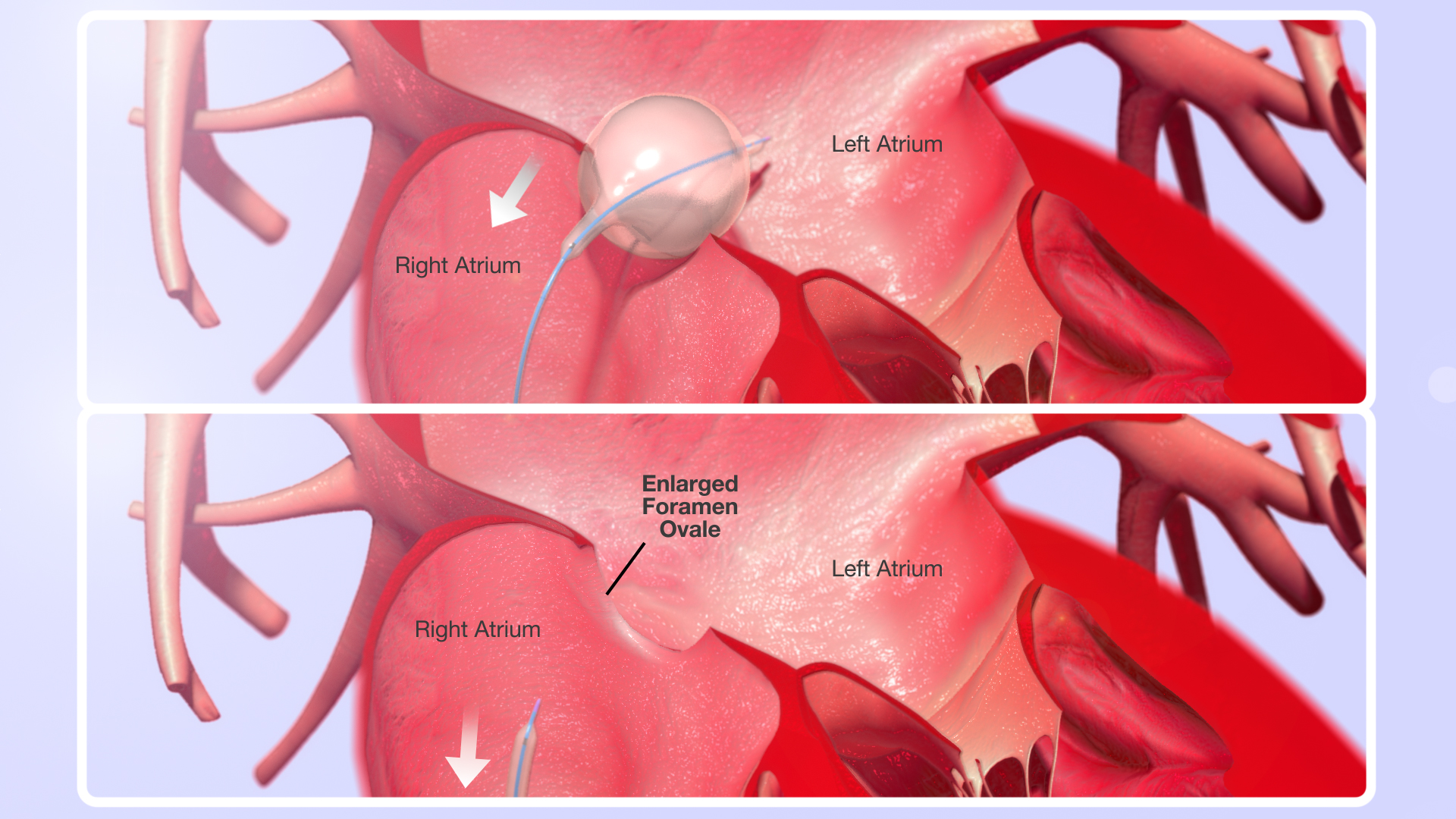
- 3D medical animation still shot showing balloon septostomy
- ICD-9-CM: 35.41

A balloon septostomy is the widening of the foramen ovale, a patent foramen ovale (PFO), or an atrial septal defect (ASD) via cardiac catheterization using a balloon catheter. This procedure allows for a greater amount of oxygenated blood to enter the systemic circulation in some cases of cyanotic congenital heart defect (CHD).

After the catheter is inserted, the deflated balloon catheter is passed from the right atrium through the foramen ovale, PFO, or ASD into the left atrium; it is then inflated and pulled back through to the right atrium, thereby enlarging the opening and allowing greater amounts of blood to pass through it. The resulting man-made opening is one of many forms of shunting, and is often referred to as an ASD.

This is normally a palliative procedure used to prepare a patient for, or sustain them until, a corrective surgery can be performed. At this time the ASD is closed using either sutures or a cardiac patch, depending on the size or nature of the opening. The procedure is often unsuccessful in infants and children older than one month because of a thickened septum.
