= Instruments used in general medicine =

Instrument	Uses
Bandage	material used to support a medical dressing or injured body part
Bedpan	for patients who are unconscious or too weak to sit up or walk to the toilet to defecate
Cannula	to create a permanent pathway to a vein (or artery) for the purpose of repeated injections or infusion of intravenous fluids
Catheter	to drain and collect urine directly from the bladder (primary use) also to act as a makeshift oxygen tube etc.
Crocodile forceps	to remove foreign bodies from ear or nasal cavities.
Electrocardiograph machine	to record the electrical activity of the heart over a period of time
Enema equipment	to inject fluid into the lower bowel for several purposes, most frequently for relieving constipation
Endoscope	to look inside the gastrointestinal tract, used mainly in surgery or by surgical consultants
External cardioverter / Defibrillator	to correct arrhythmias of the heart
Gas cylinder	as a supply of oxygen, nitrous oxide, carbon dioxide, etc.
Gauze sponge	to absorb blood and other fluids as well as clean wounds
Glucose monitor	to measure concentration of glucose in blood
Haemodialysis machine	to remove toxic materials from the blood that are generally removed by the kidneys; used in case of kidney failure
Hypodermic needle / Syringe	for injections and aspiration of blood or fluid from the body
Infection control equipment	as in gloves, gowns, bonnets, shoe covers, face shields, goggles, and surgical masks for preventing nosocomial or healthcare-associated infection
Instrument sterilizer	to sterilize instruments in absence of an autoclave
Kidney dish	as a tray for instruments, gauze, tissue, etc.
Measuring tape	for length, height, head circumference and girth measurements
Medical halogen penlight	to see into the eye, natural orifices, etc. and to test for pupillary light reflex, etc.
Medical ultrasound	to create an image of internal body structures
Nasogastric tube	for nasogastric suction or the introduction of food or drugs into the body
Nebulizer	to produce aerosols of drugs to be administered by respiratory route
Ophthalmoscope	to look at the retina
Otoscope	to look into the external ear cavity
Oxygen mask and tubes	to deliver gases to the mouth/nostrils to assist in oxygen intake or to administer aerosolized or gaseous drugs
Pipette or dropper	to measure out doses of liquid, specially in children
Proctoscope	to look inside the anal canal and lower part of the rectum
Radiography	to view internal body structures
Reflex hammer	to test motor reflexes of the body
Sphygmomanometer	to measure the patient's blood pressure
Stethoscope	to hear sounds from movements within the body like heart beats, intestinal movement, breath sounds, etc.
Suction device	to suck up blood or secretions
Surgical scissors	used for dissecting or cutting
Thermometer	to record body temperature
Tongue depressor	for use in oral examination
Transfusion kit	to transfuse blood and blood products
Tuning fork	to test for deafness and to categorize it
Ventilator	to assist or carry out the mechanical act of inspiration and expiration so the non-respiring patient can do so; a common component of "life support"
Wartenberg wheel	for neurological use
Watch / Stopwatch	for recording rates like heart rate, respiratory rate, etc.; for certain hearing tests.
Weighing scale	to measure weight

== Image gallery ==
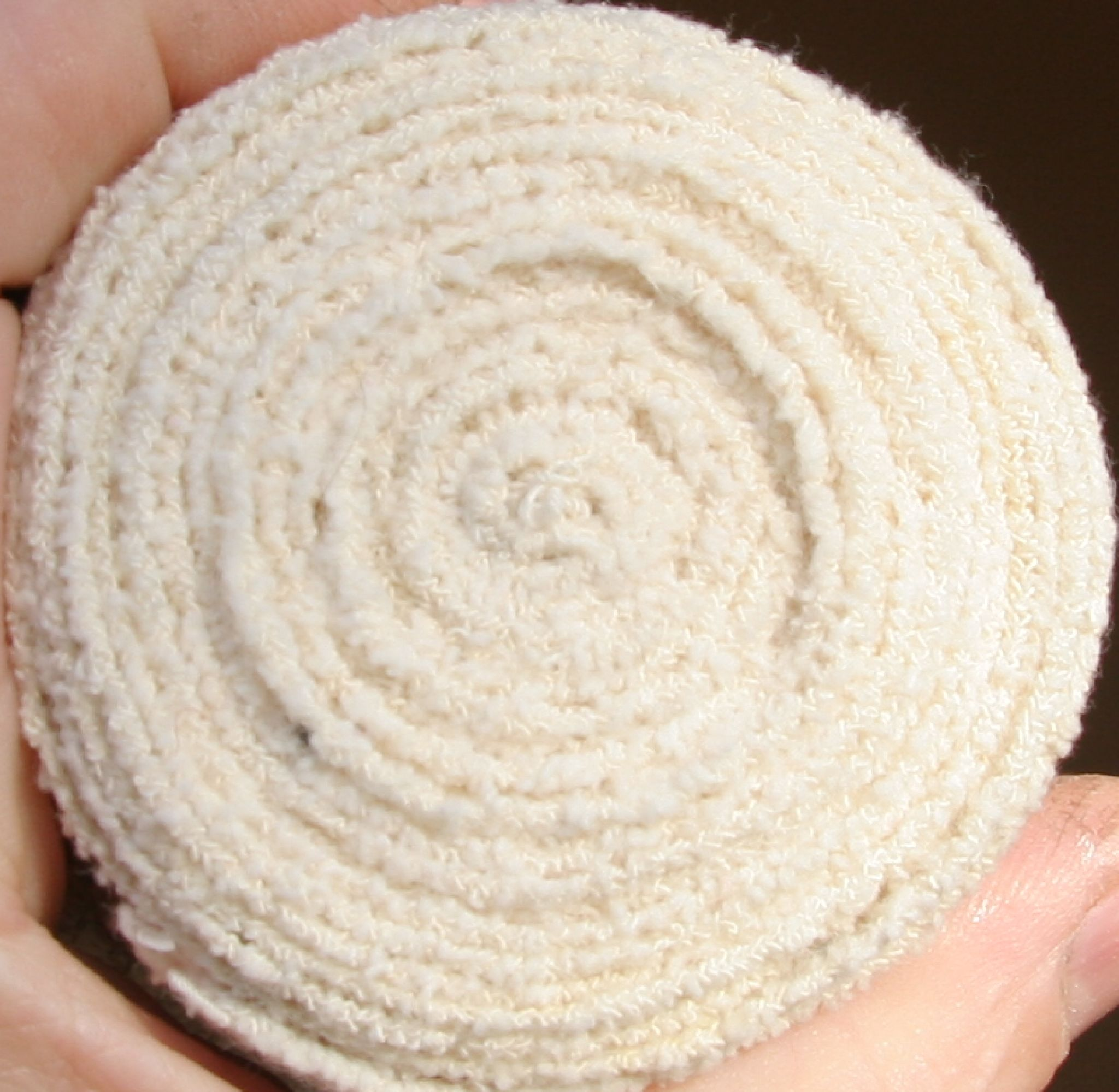
Bandage

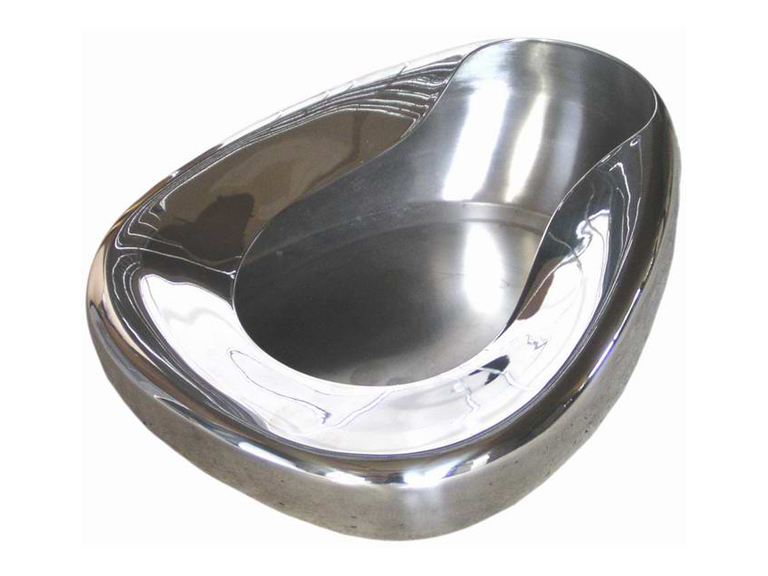
Bedpan

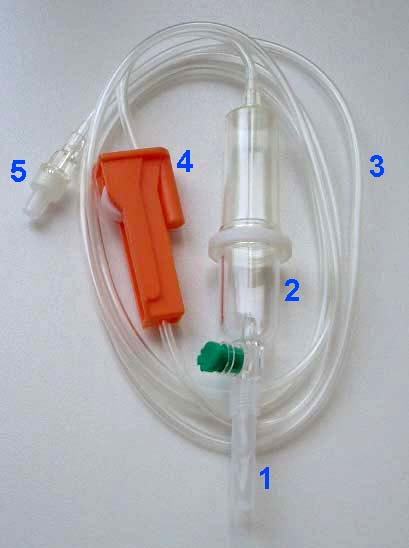
Blood infusion set

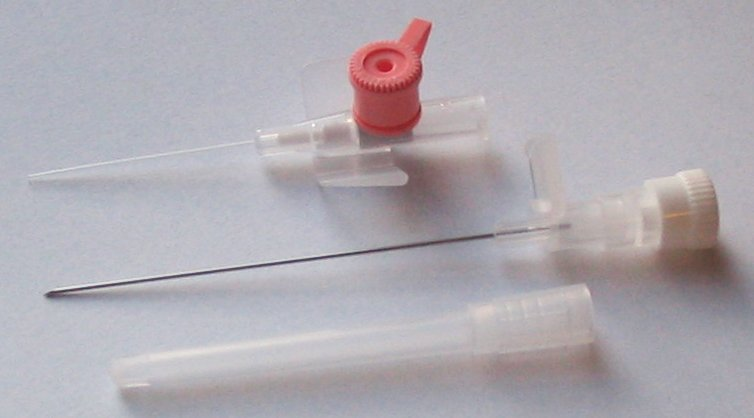
Cannula, intraveneous (separated)

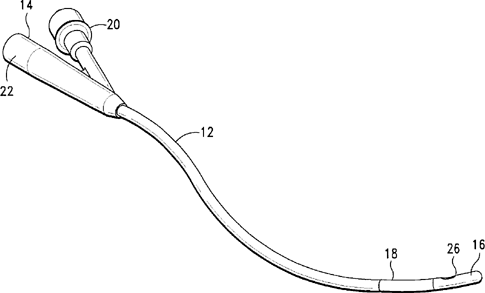
Catheter, Foley

Defibrillator

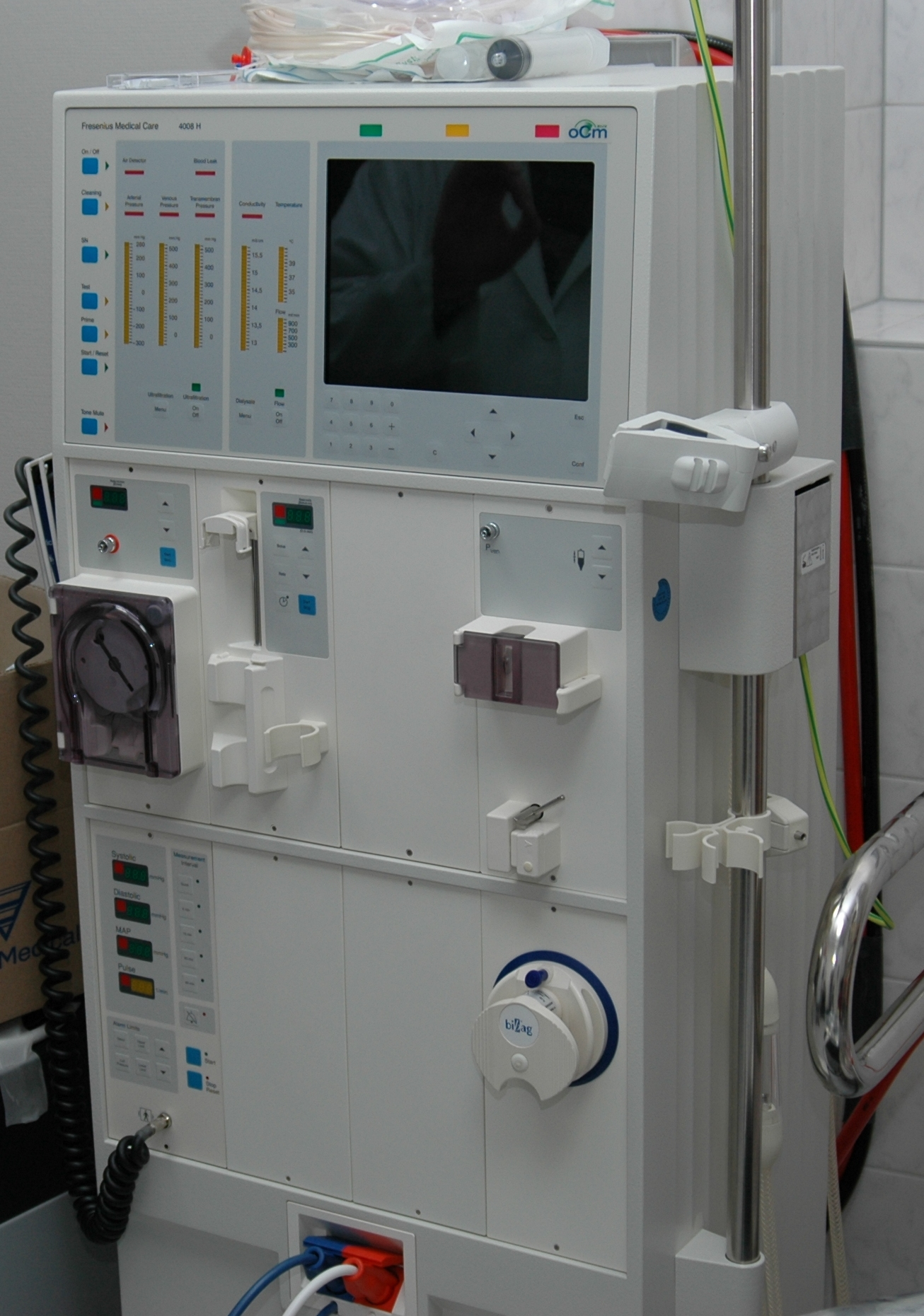
Dialyser, hemodialysis

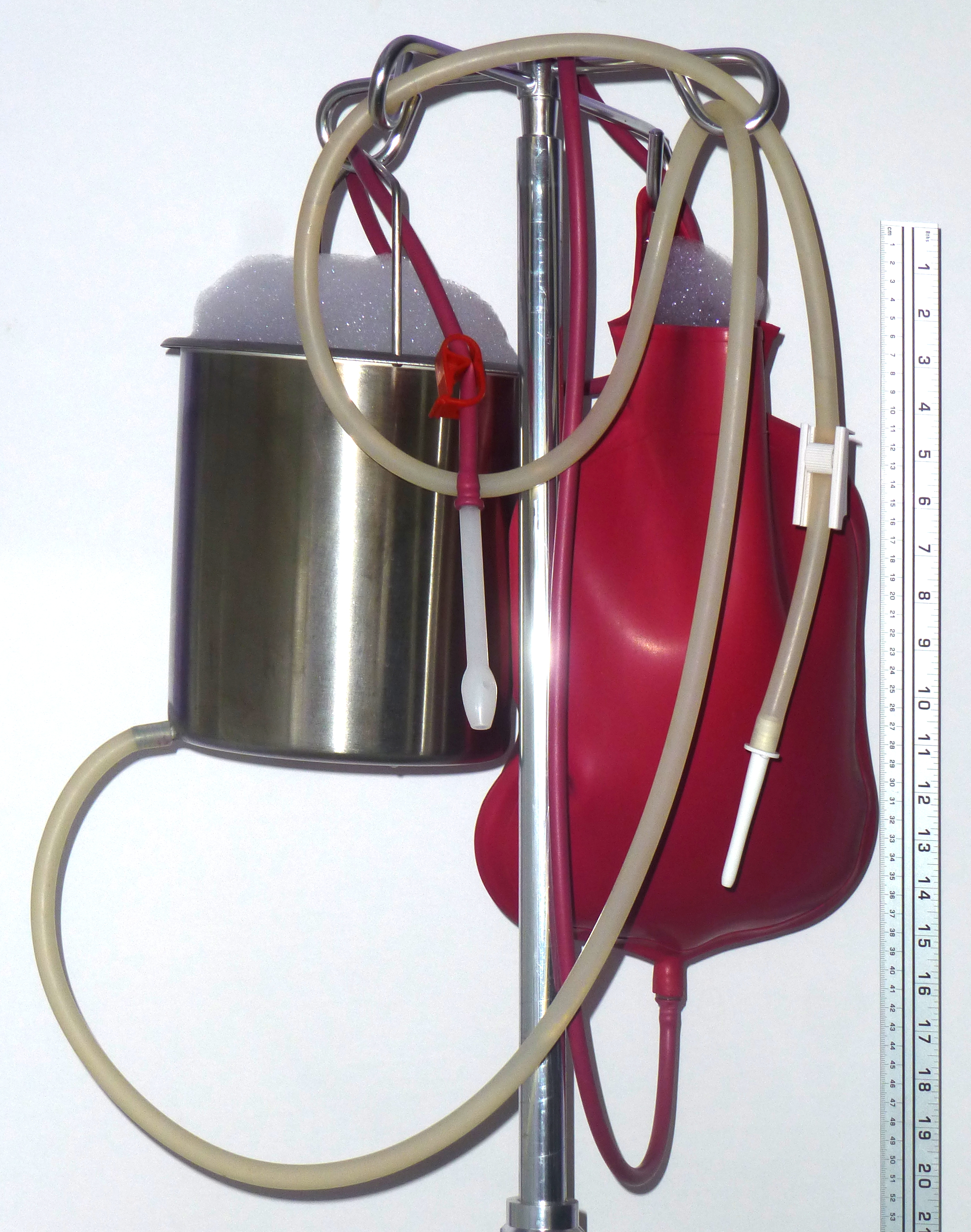
Enema bag and enema bucket

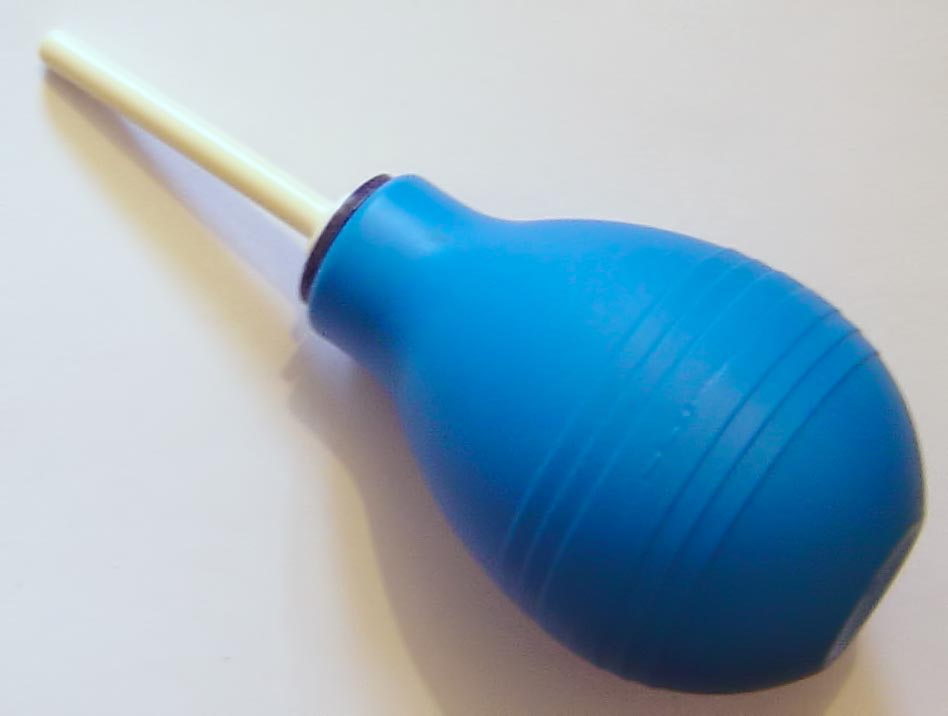
Enema bulb

Enema set

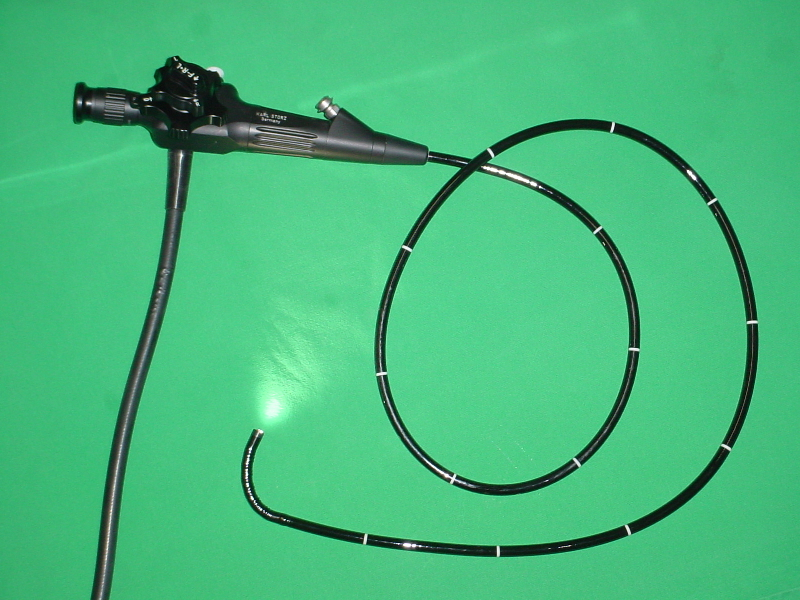
Endoscope

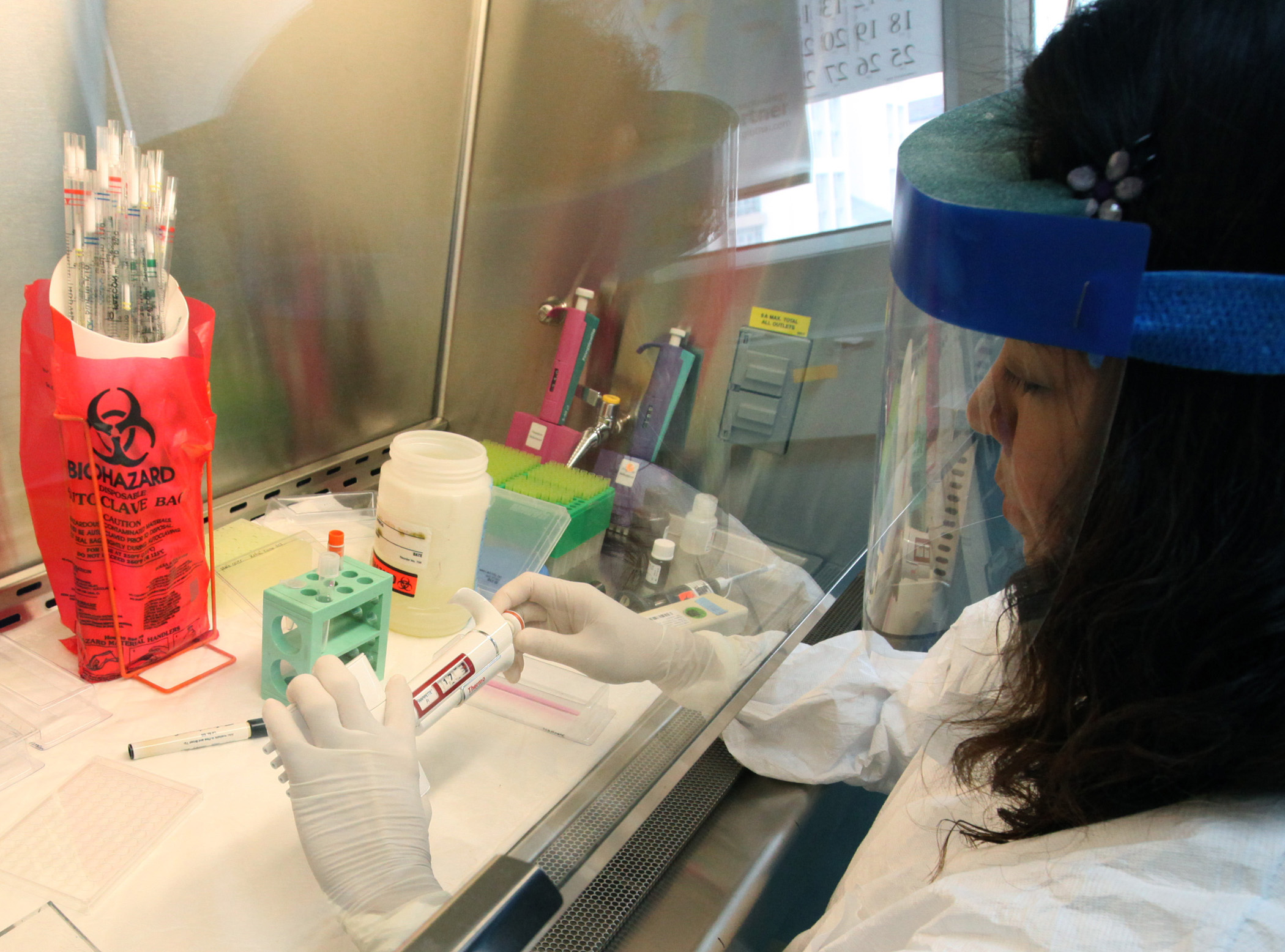
Face shield

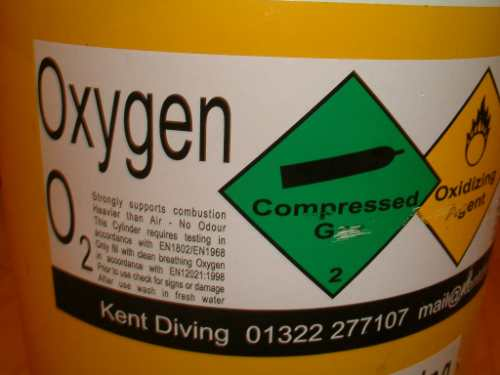
Gas cylinder, oxygen

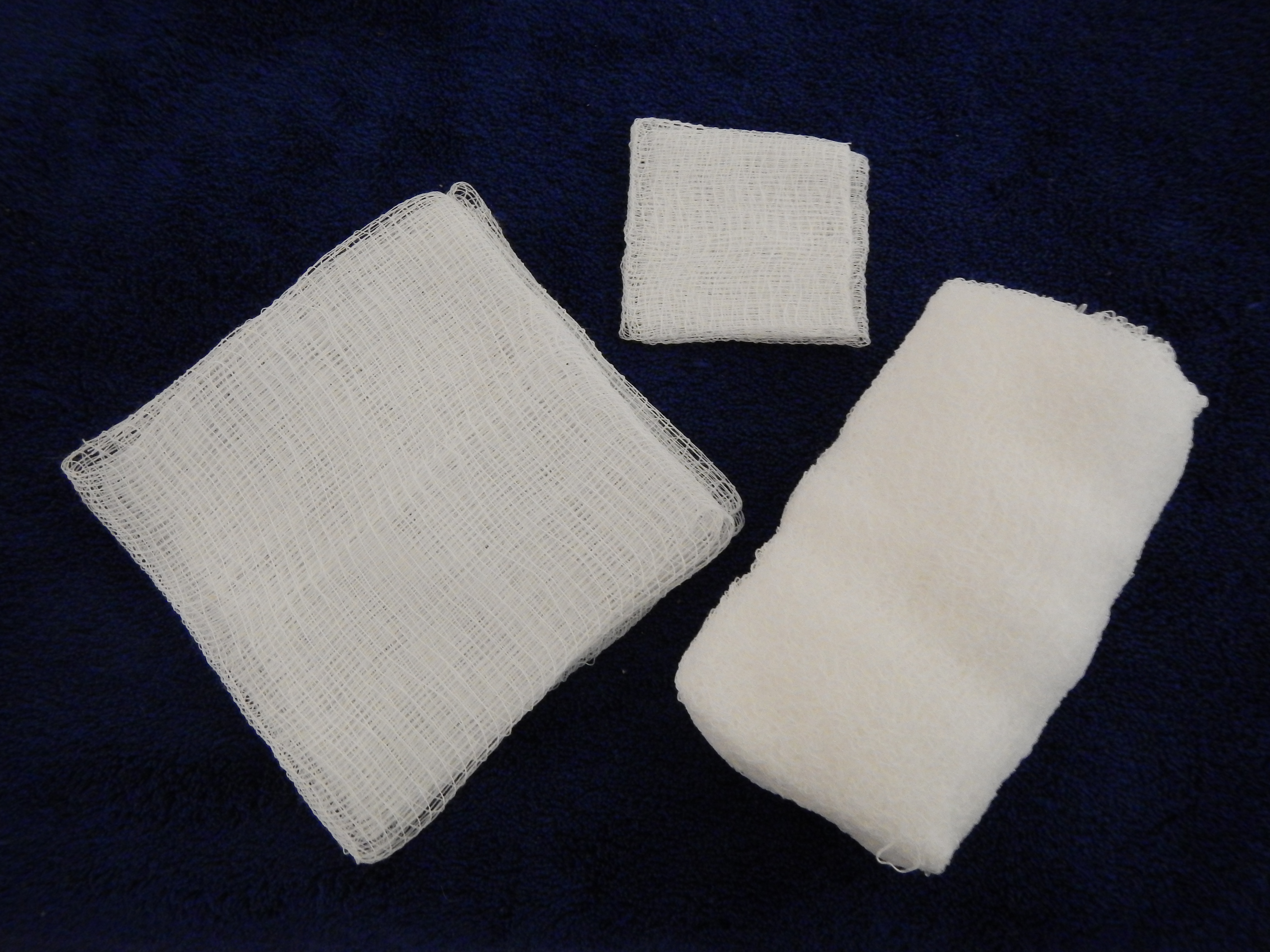
Gauze sponges

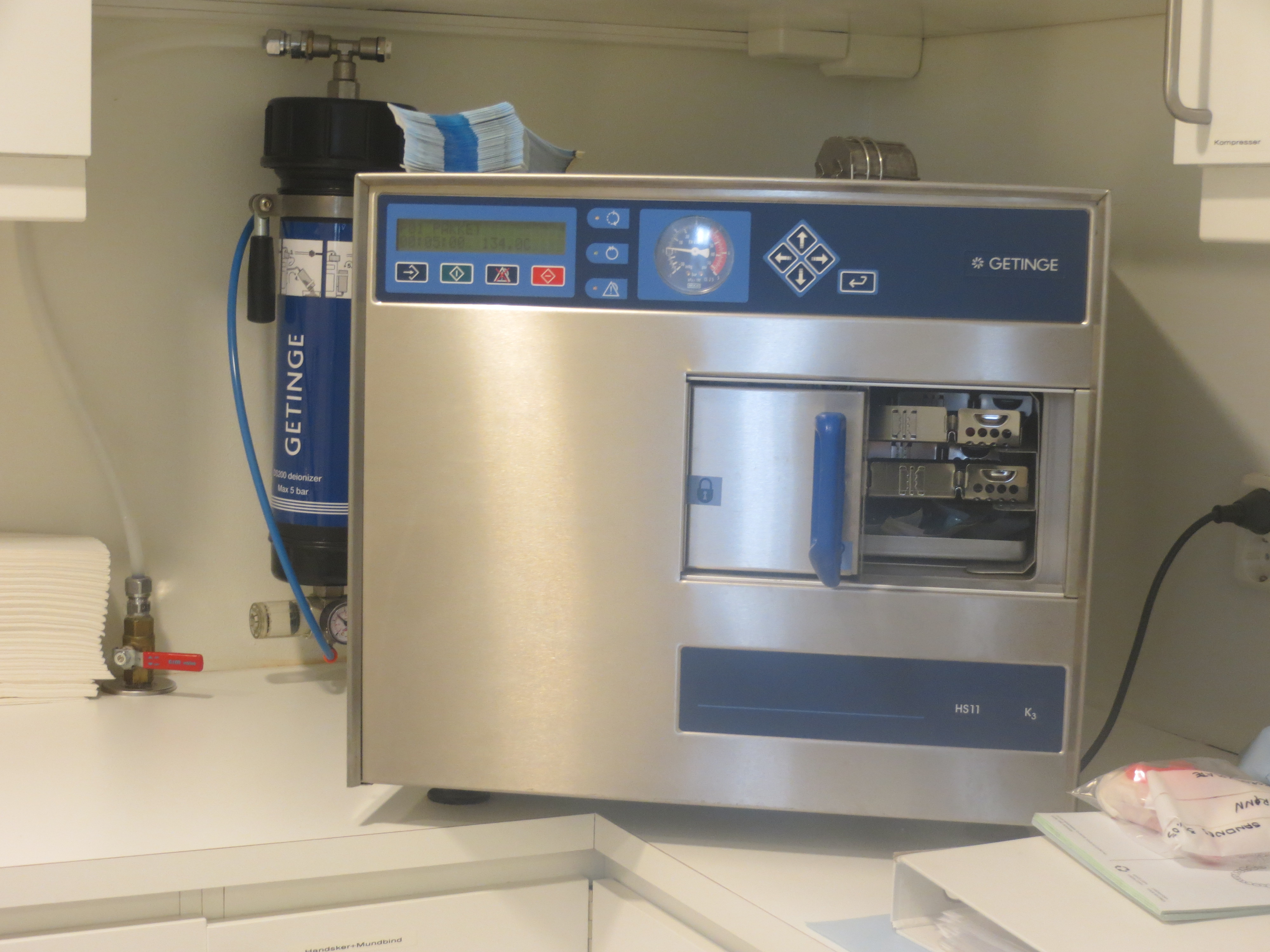
Instrument sterilizer

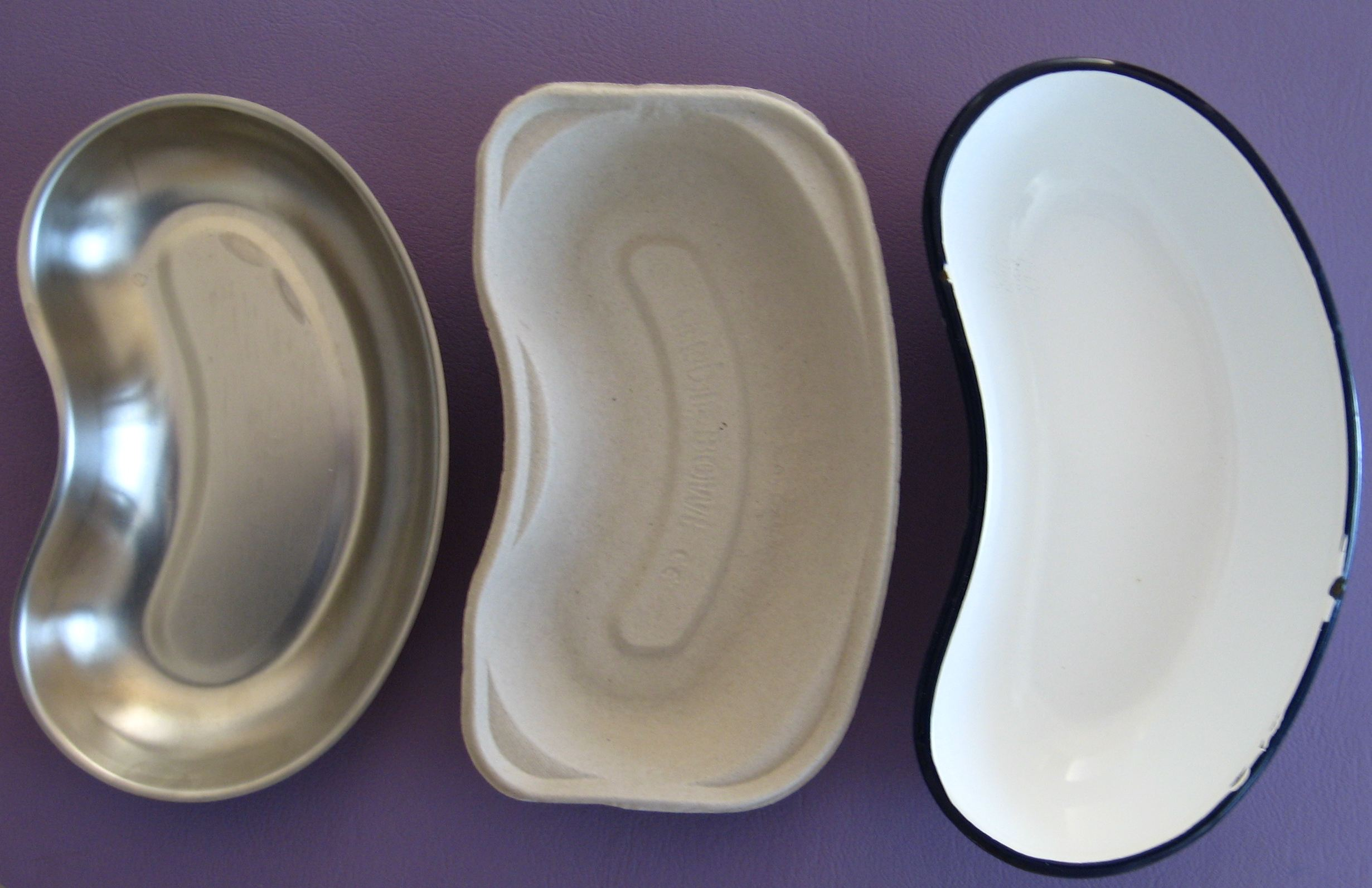
Kidney dish

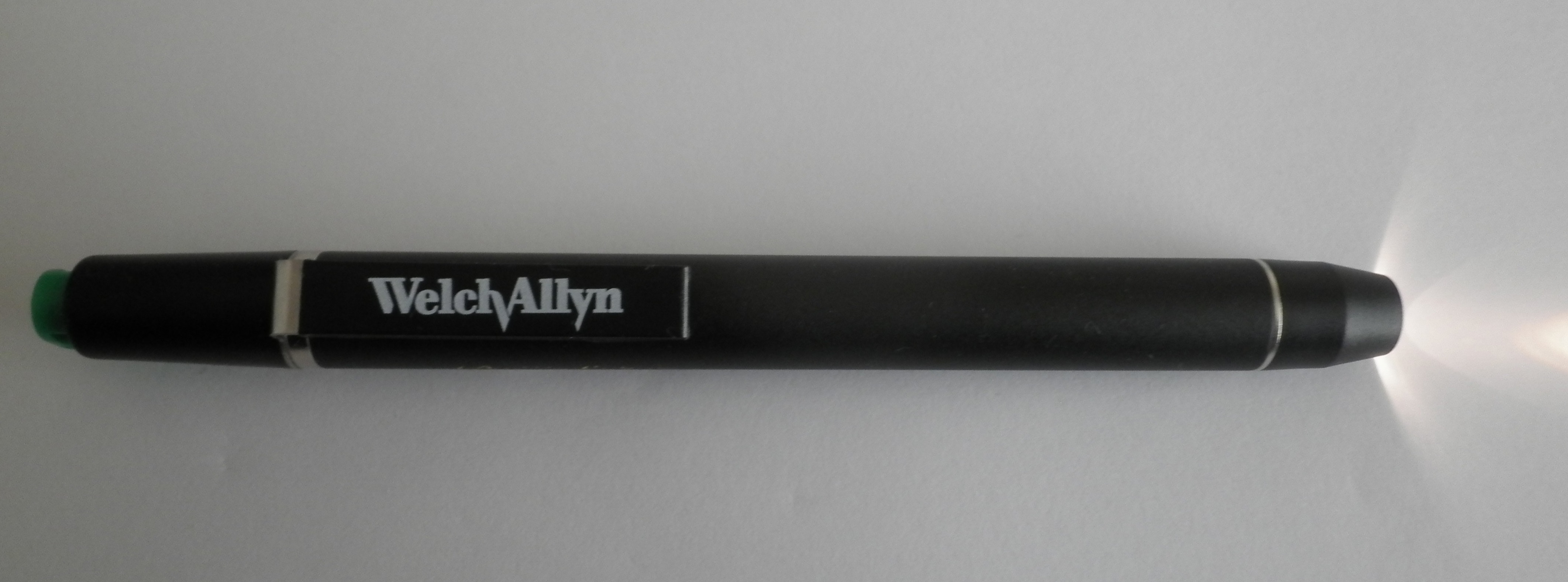
Medical halogen penlight

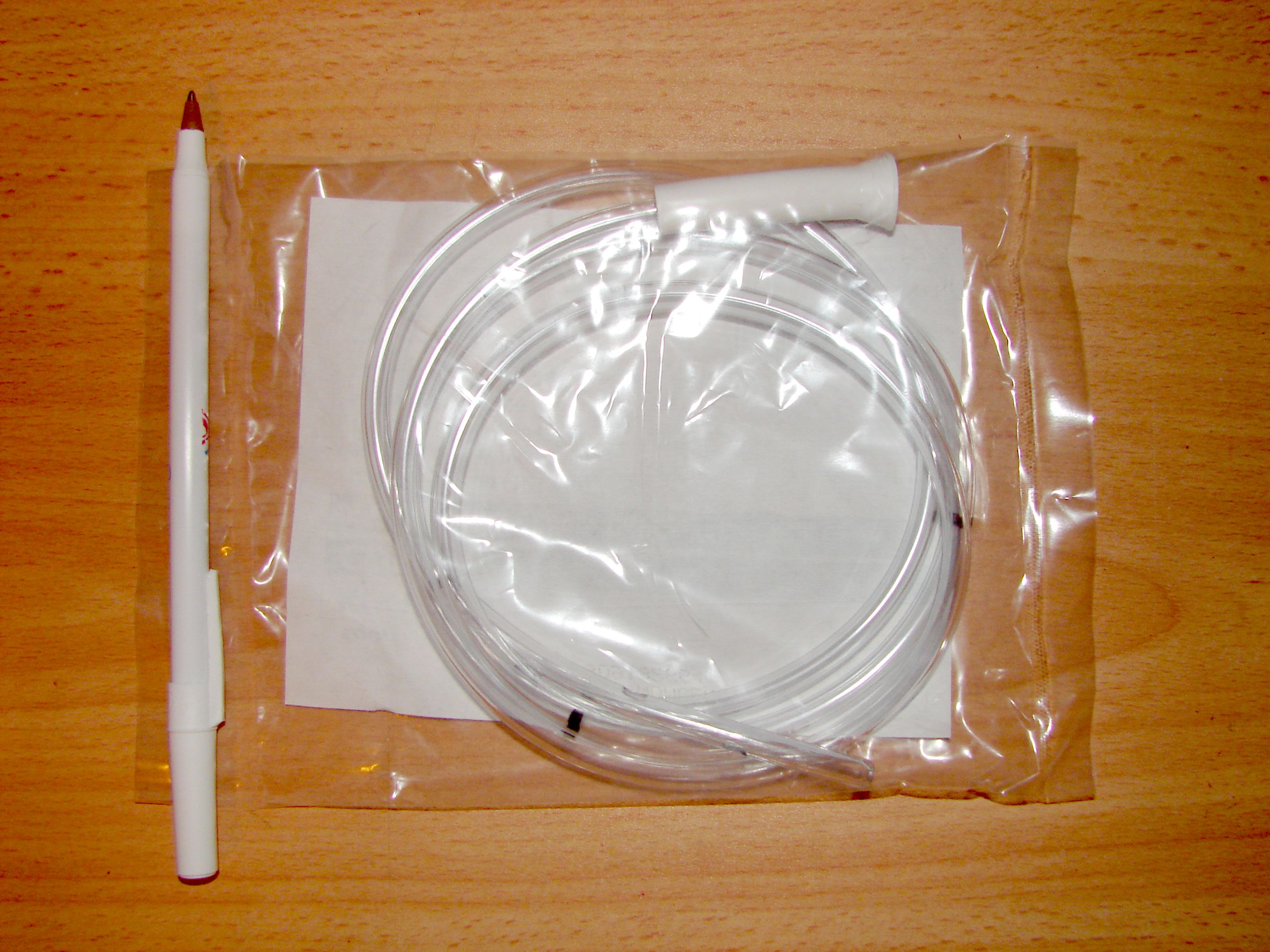
Nasogastric tube, Levin

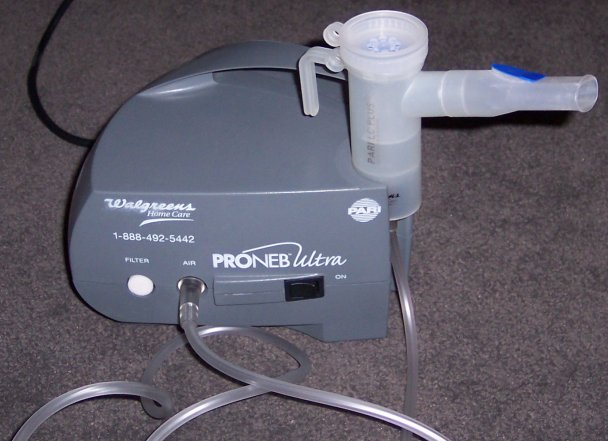
Nebulizer

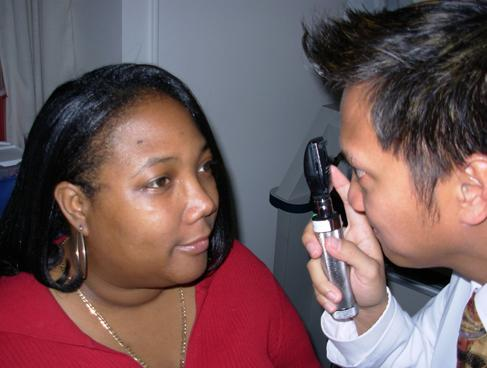
Ophthalmoscope

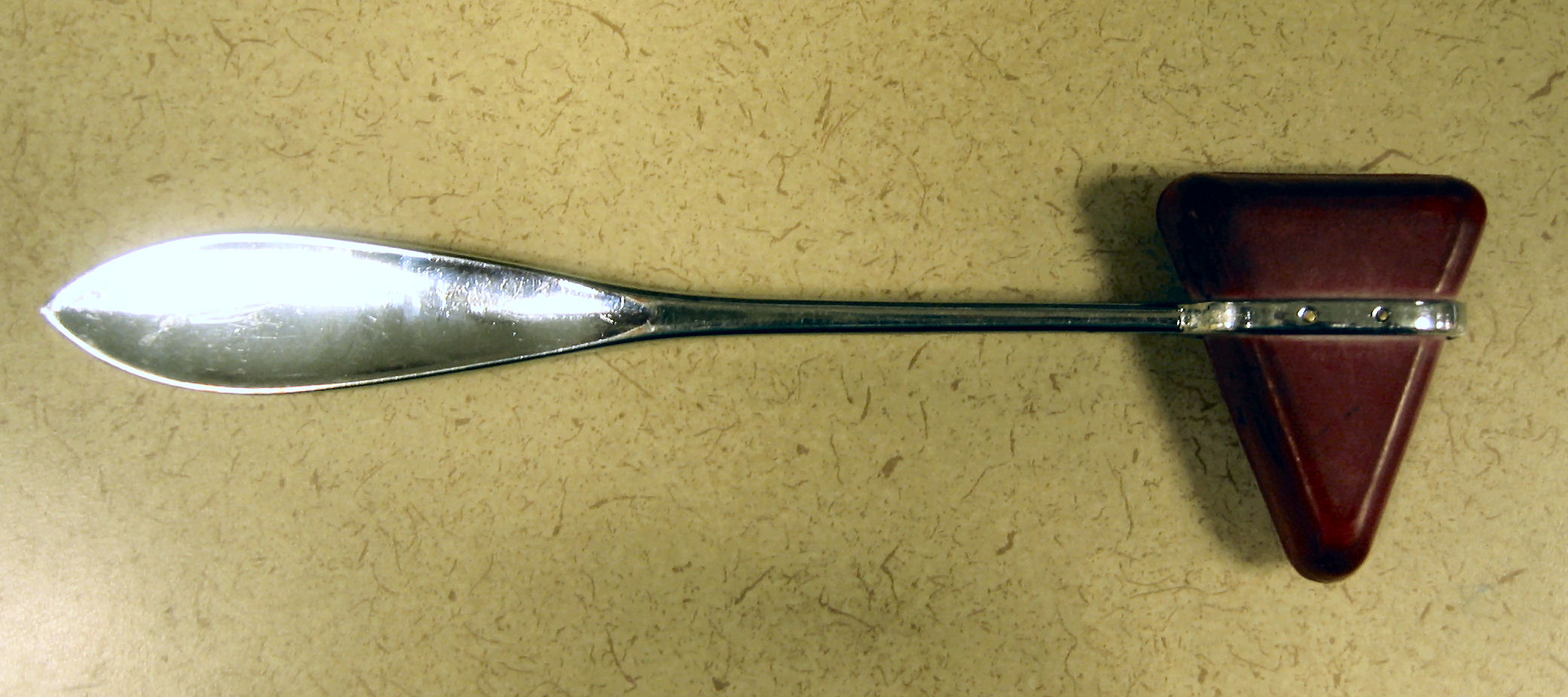
Reflex hammer

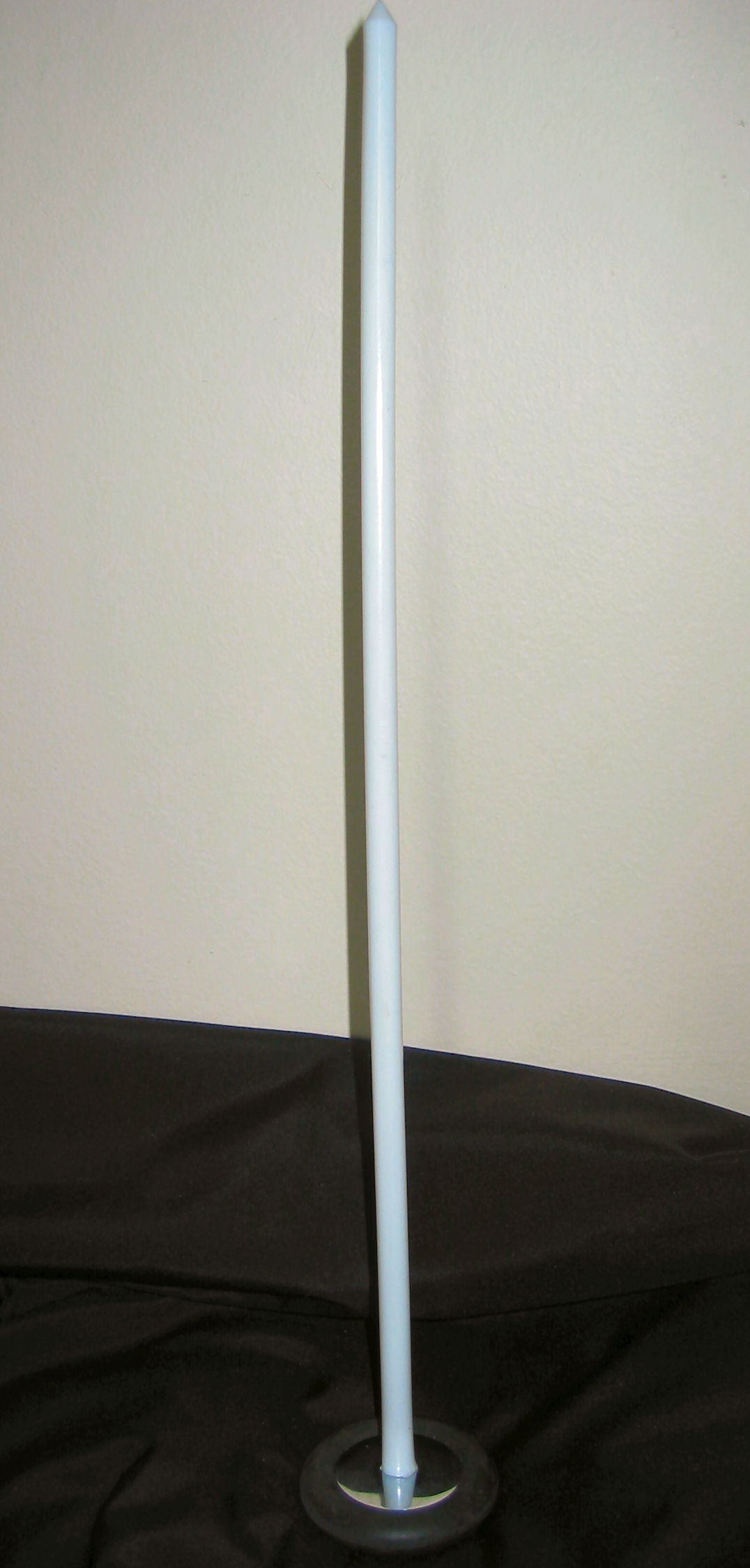
Reflex hammer, queen square

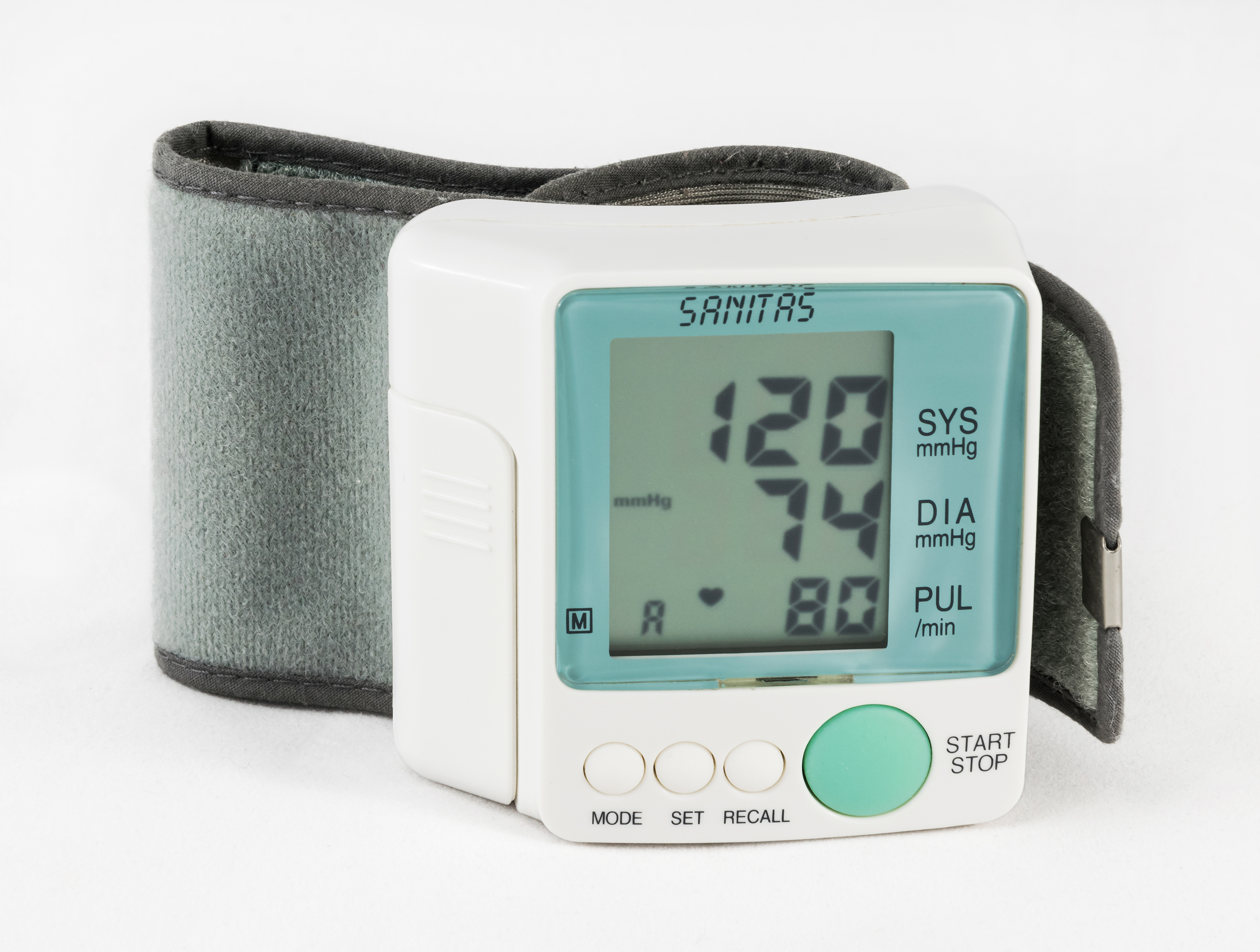
Sphygmomanometer, electronic

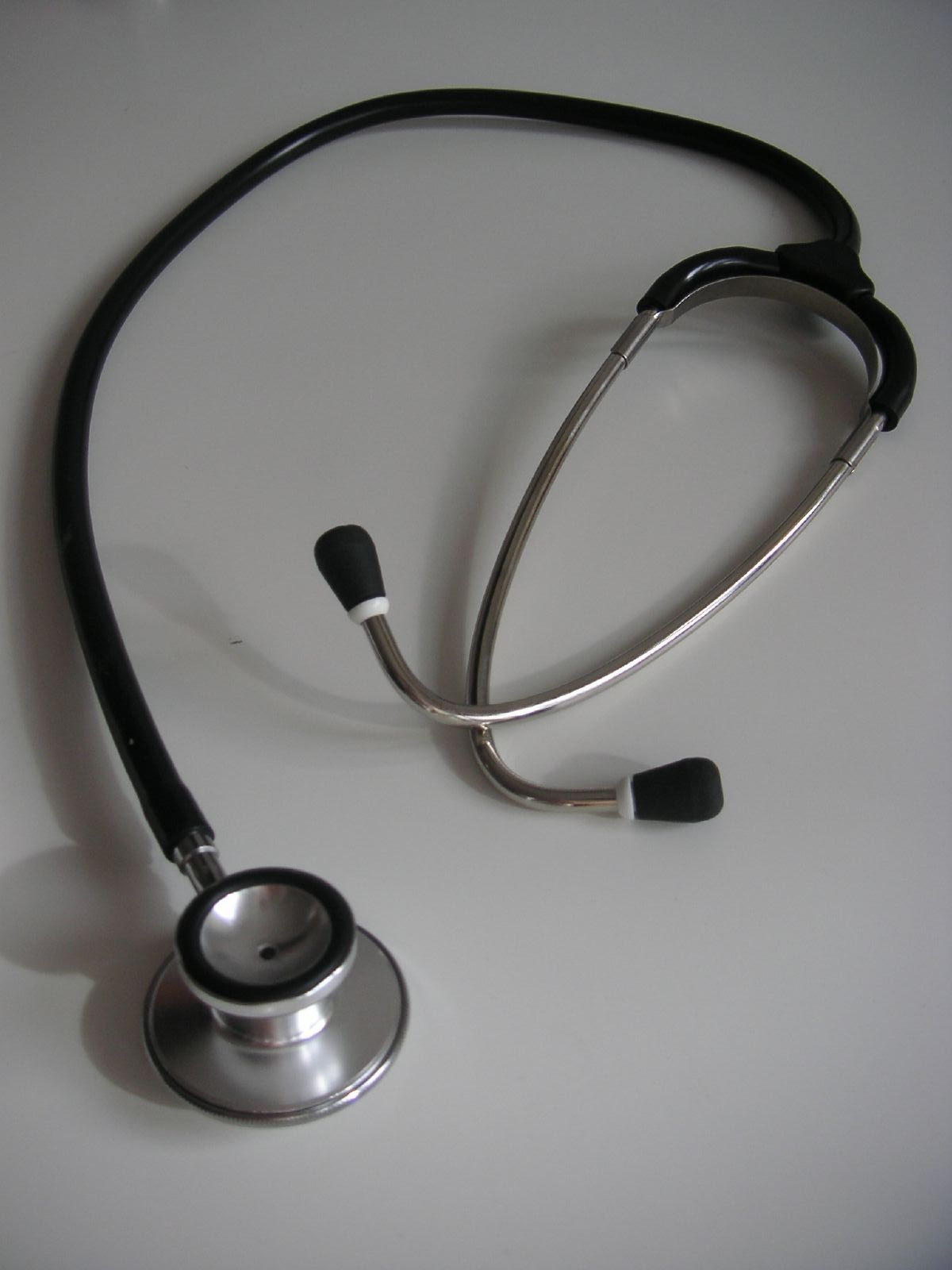
Stethoscope

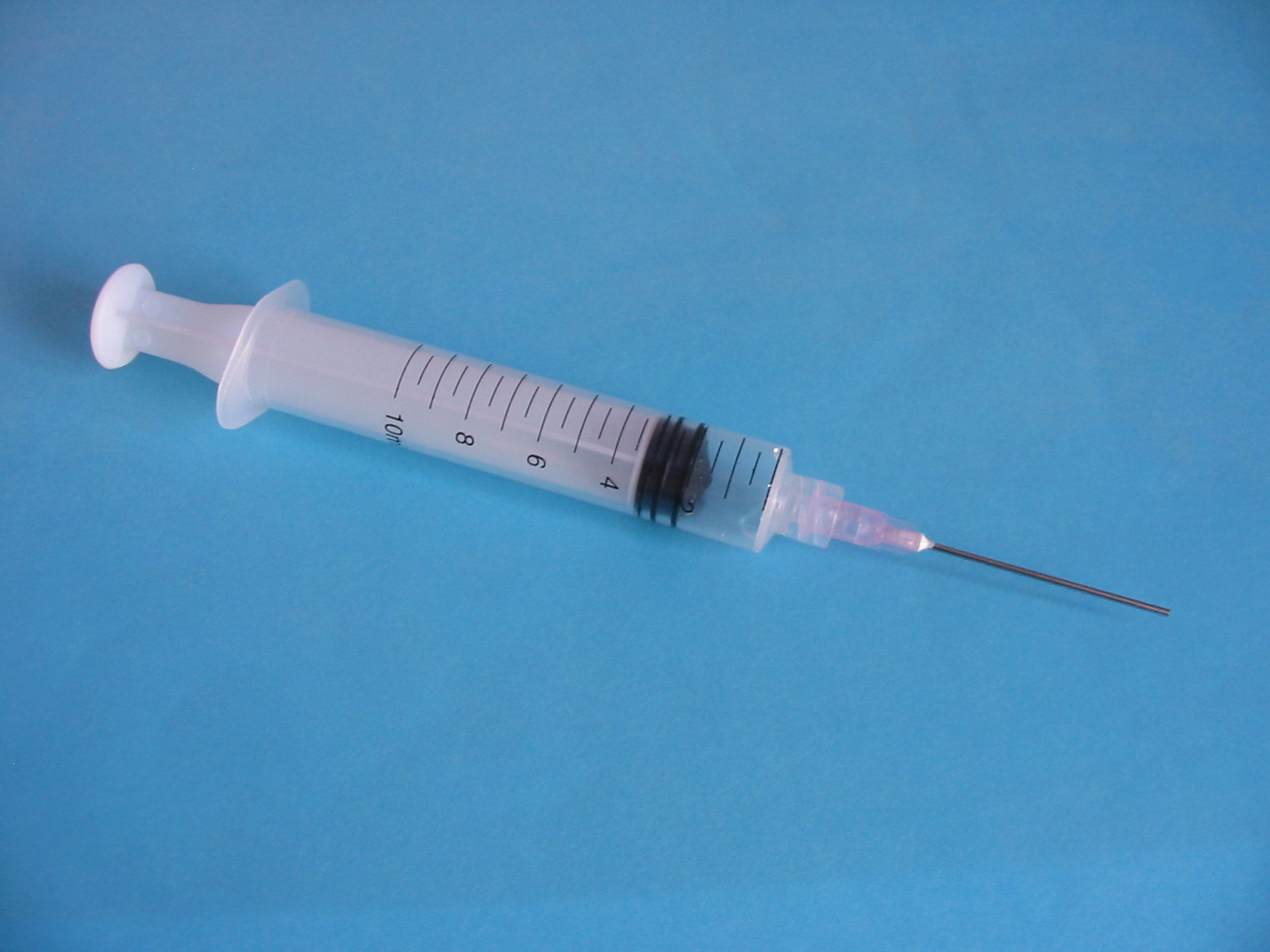
Syringe and needle

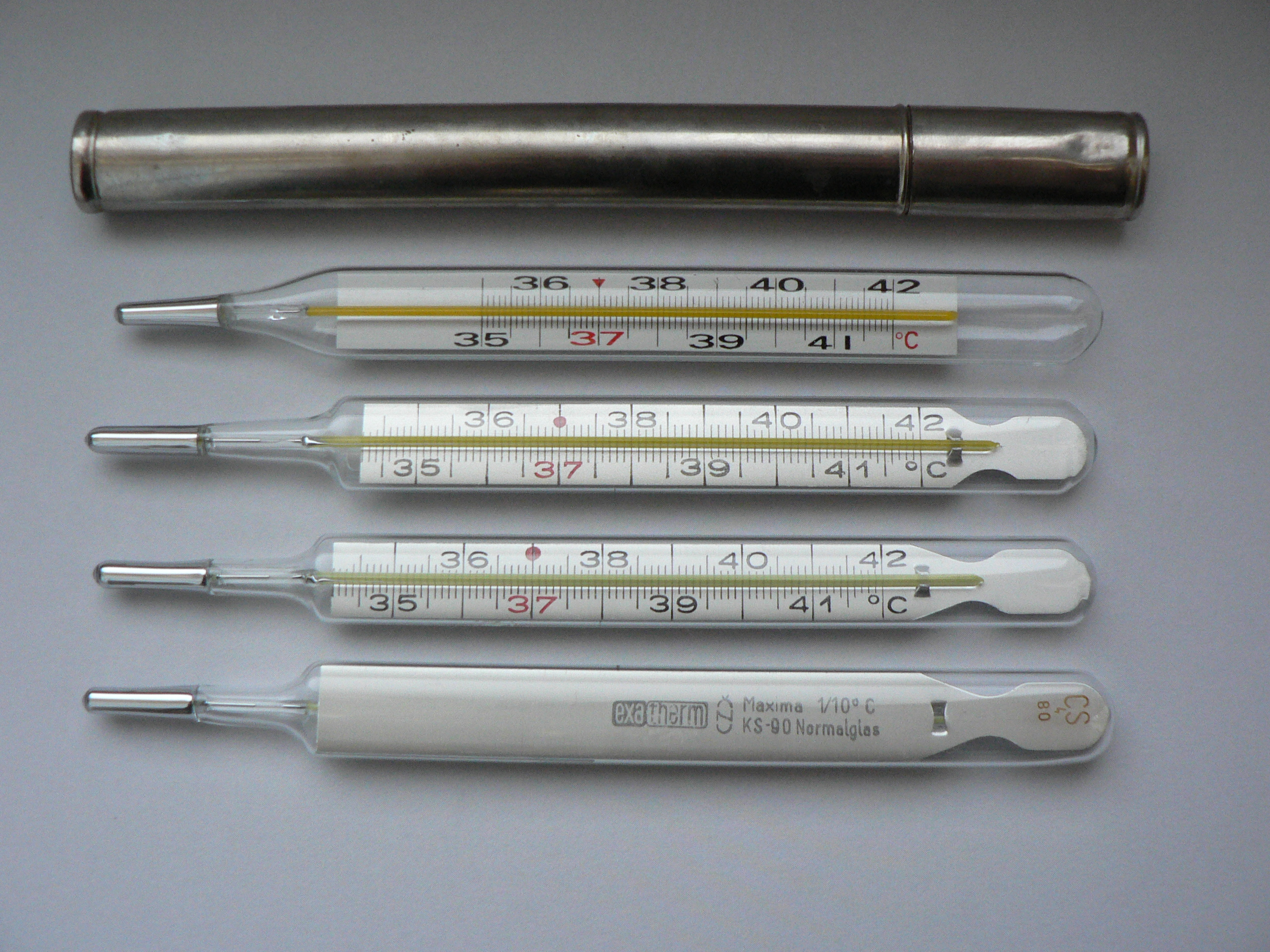
Thermometers, mercury

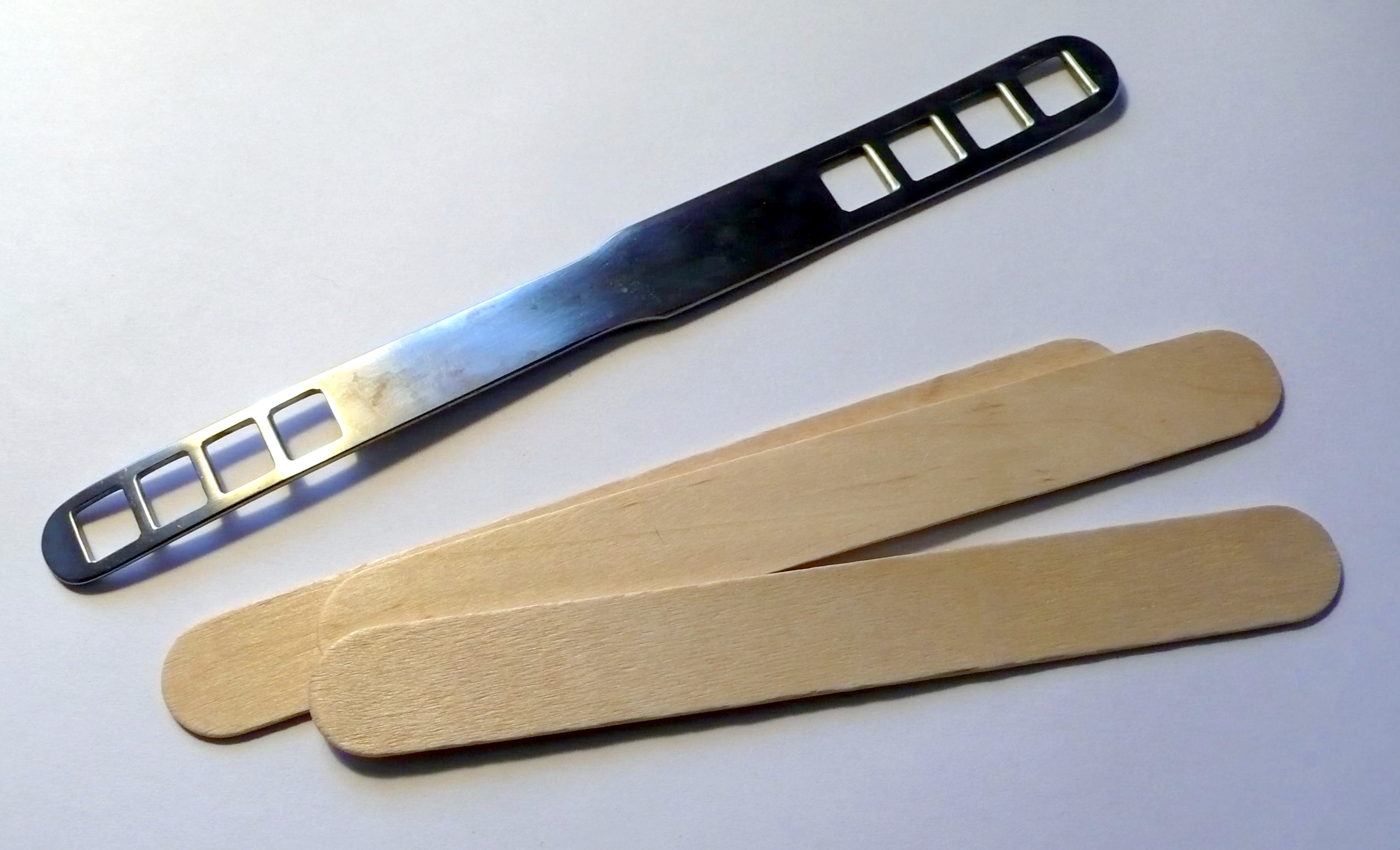
Tongue depressors

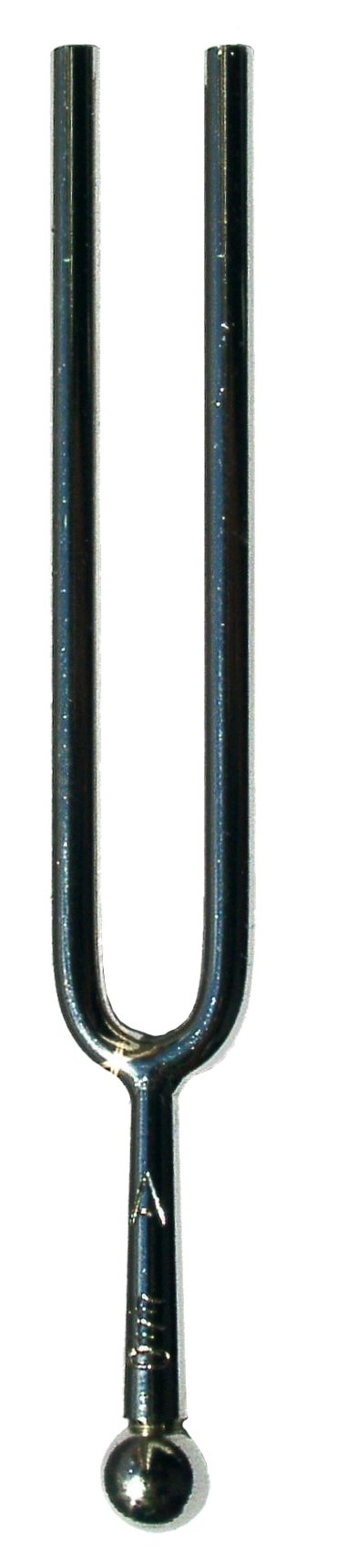
Tuning fork

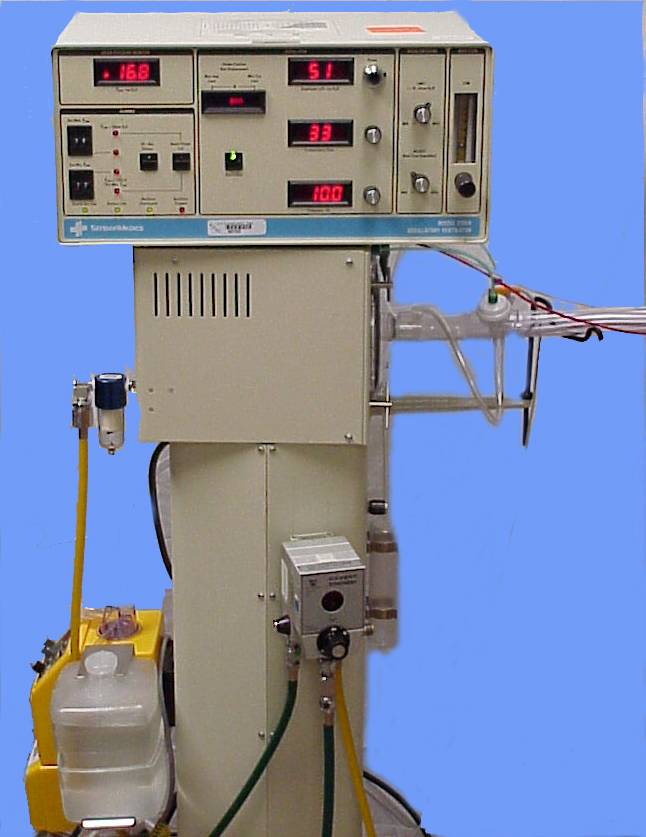
Ventilator, high-frequency

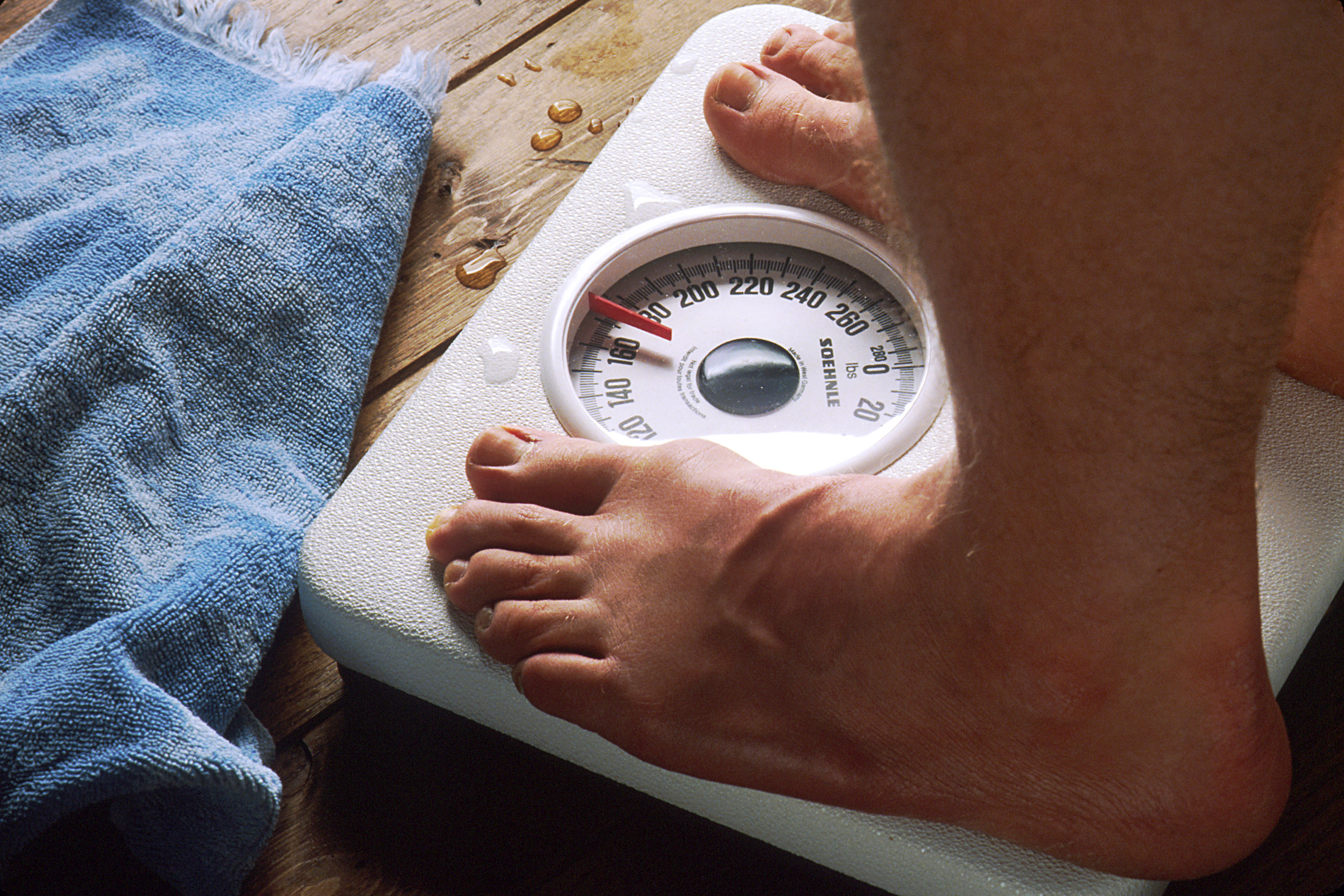
Weighing scale

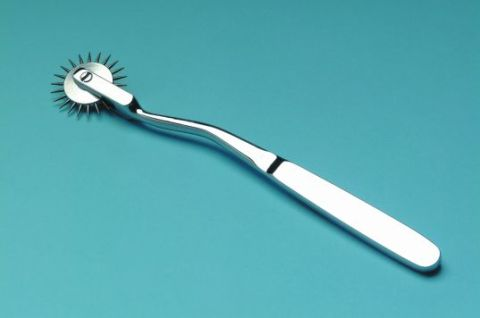
Wartenberg wheel
