= Electroanatomic mapping =

Electroanatomic mapping is a method of creating a three dimensional model of the human heart during clinical cardiac electrophysiology procedures.

== Technology ==
The fundamental concept of electroanatomic mapping systems is to localize catheters within the heart in three dimensional space (a sort of "GPS" within the heart). Building a 3-D model of the heart with real-time visualization permits reduction in fluoroscopy use. In addition to 3-D structure, the voltage and timing of signals at each point of the heart is recorded to generate different maps to understand and treat different rhythm disturbances.

Each of the three systems utilizes different techniques to localize catheters:

- Carto uses a low-intensity magnetic field (5-50 μT) with tri-axial inductors in the tip of the catheters to triangulate the tip based on the sense magnetic field relative to sensors placed on the front and back of the chest. Carto 3 adds emission of electric fields from each unique electrode on a catheter to add more localization information.
- EnSite uses three sets of electrodes to induced an electric field in the X, Y, and Z axes and the impedances generated by the electric fields.
- Rhythmia uses both impedance and magnetic fields.

== Systems ==
There are three electroanatomic mapping systems commercially available.

=== Carto ===
Biosense-Webster, a subsidiary of Johnson & Johnson, produces a cardiac electrophysiology system called CARTO. The system is designed to visualise the real-time calculated position and orientation of a specialised RF ablation catheter within the patient's heart in order to minimise radiation exposure during fluoroscopy, increase the accuracy of targeted RF ablation and reacquisition of pacing sites for re-ablation. Its navigation system calculates the position and orientation of the catheter tip, using three known magnetic sources as references. The system uses static magnetic fields that are calibrated and computer controlled. Due to the nature of magnetic fields, the orientation may also be calculated while the tip is stationary. By calculating the strength and orientation of the magnetic fields at a given location, the x,y,z position may be calculated along with the roll, pitch, yaw orientation.

=== Ensite ===
St. Jude Medical, now a part of Abbott, manufactures EnSite family of cardiac mapping systems, the latest edition being EnSite Precision, which allows speedy heart mapping during catheter ablation with better accuracy to be able to treat cardiac rhythm disturbances.

=== Rhythmia / Opal ===
Rhythmia is a mapping system developed by Boston Scientific. It has changed names to Opal.

== Uses of electroanatomic mapping ==
Mapping systems generate three kinds of data:

- geometry of the chamber(s) of the heart based on movement of catheters in space
- voltage maps based on the amplitude of electrogram recordings
- timing maps ("local activation time" or LAT) based on the relative timing of electrogram recordings at different positions in the heart.
