= Balloon catheter =

Medical device

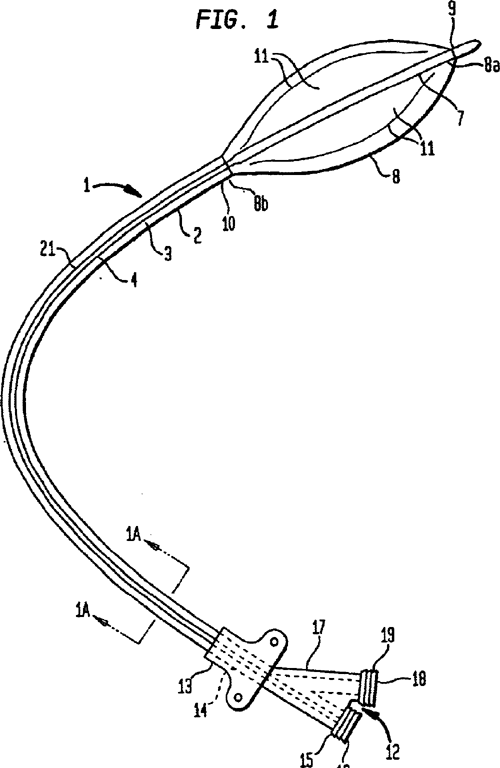
Diagram of a balloon catheter.

A balloon catheter is a type of "soft" catheter with an inflatable "balloon" at its tip which is used during a catheterization procedure to enlarge a narrow opening or passage within the body. The deflated balloon catheter is positioned, then inflated to perform the necessary procedure, and deflated again in order to be removed.

Some common uses include:

- angioplasty or balloon septostomy, via cardiac catheterization (heart cath)
- tuboplasty via uterine catheterization
- pyeloplasty using a detachable inflatable balloon stent positioned via a cystoscopic transvesicular approach.

== Angioplasty balloon catheters ==
Balloon catheters used in angioplasty are either of Over-the-Wire (OTW) or Rapid Exchange (Rx) design. Rx catheters nowadays are about 90% of the Coronary Intervention market. While OTW Catheters may still be useful in highly tortuous vascular pathways, they sacrifice deflation time and pushability. When a balloon catheter is used to compress plaque within a clogged coronary artery, it is referred to as a plain old balloon angioplasty or POBA. Balloon catheters are also utilized in the deployment of stents during angioplasty. Balloon catheters are supplied to the cath lab with a stent pre-mounted on the balloon. When the cardiologist inflates the balloon it expands the stent. When the cardiologist subsequently deflates the balloon, the stent stays behind in the artery and the balloon catheter can be removed. Stents that are used in conjunction with a balloon catheter are known as balloon expandable stents, as opposed to self-expandable stents, typically made of Nitinol alloy or polyester.

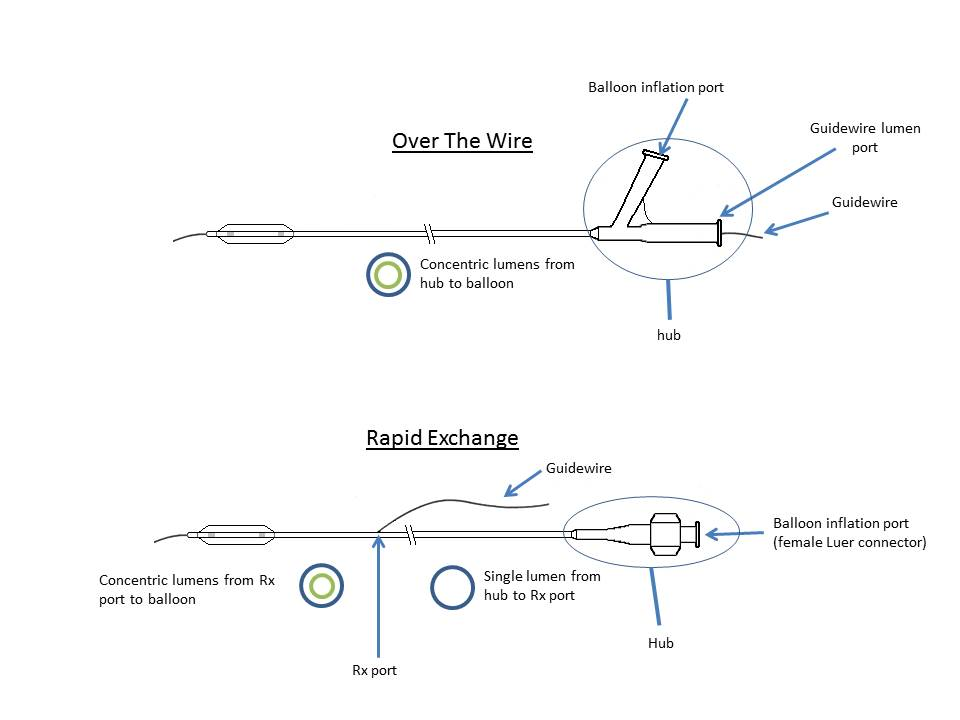
Anatomy of OTW vs. Rx balloon catheter

== Ureteric (pyeloplasty) balloon catheter ==
Ureteric balloon catheters are used to treat ureteropelvic junction (UPJ) obstructions caused by intrinsic wall factors as fibrosis and / or hypertrophic wall problems. They can also help to solve Brickers bladder (also called Ileal conduit) problems. Their application is significantly less invasive than other treatments for obstructive uropathy.

== See also ==
- Foley catheter, a catheter with an inflatable balloon to retain it in the urinary tract.
