= Ureteric balloon catheter =

Ureter treatment

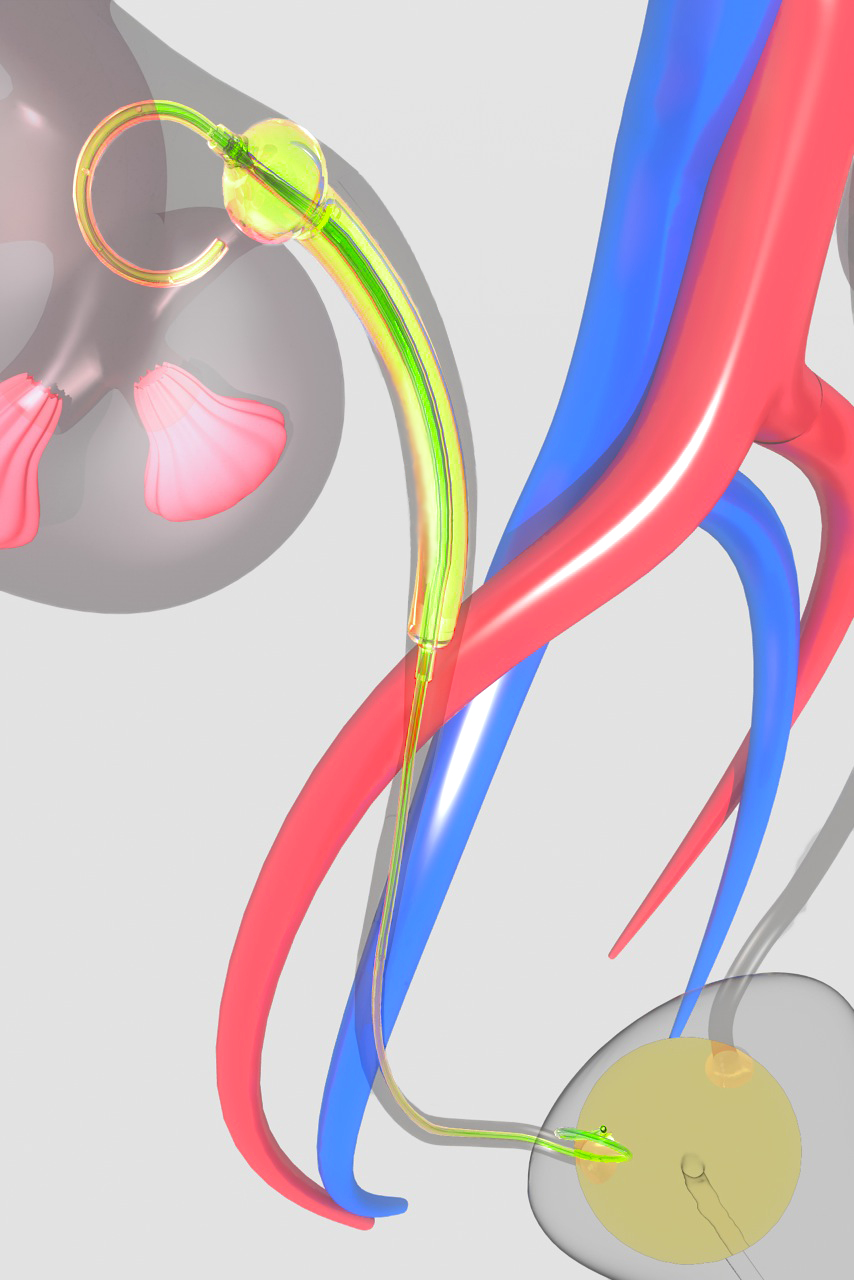
- Sketch of an ureteric balloon catheter placed in the ureter.
- Specialty: Urology

A ureteric balloon catheter is a balloon catheter intended for treating strictures of the ureter. In fact it is a double J stent on which a balloon is mounted. It is connected to a delivery device (pusher) to introduce it from the bladder into the ureter. The system comprises a non-return valve device, and a pusher with a stylet and two ports.

The side port is for injecting contrast agent to inflate the balloon, while the straight port is for the guidewire. The catheter has a relatively large-diameter central lumen and a shaft of 2 mm (6 Fr.). The balloon is in two sections: a long narrow section or shaft and a larger cranial bulb. The larger cranial bulb prevents distal migration, while the longer narrow section maintains the increased diameter of a predilated stricture in the ureter section.

== Stent placement and removal ==
A guide wire has to be placed in the ureter. After dilatation of the ureteric stricture with a high pressure dilatation balloon the guidewire remains in place to bring in the ureteric balloon catheter.

The balloon is inflated by an injection of contrast medium via side port of the pusher and remains in situ while the expanded urothelium heals. The stylet is used to detach the balloon catheter from the pusher. During the healing process urine drains through the wide central lumen while the balloon remains inflated. The ureteric balloon catheter may be used in conjunction with a double J stent for additional drainage. To remove the catheter after several weeks the balloon is deflated by snipping the distal end of the catheter. The catheter can then safely be pulled out.

== Indications ==
The ureteric balloon catheter is intended to cure two major types of diseases:

- Ureteropelvic junction obstruction (also called UPJ obstruction or Pelvic-ureteric junction obstruction PUJO) caused by intrinsic wall factors as fibrosis and / or hypertrophic wall problems.

and

- Brickers bladder (also called Ileal conduit) problems. Up to 10% of patients who undergo ileal conduit urinary diversion may go on to develop ureteroileal anastomotic stenosis. This can lead to obstructive symptoms as side pain, infection and finally deterioration in renal function which can be relieved by the treatment with this balloon catheter.

An intervention according to this Overtoom procedure is significantly less invasive than the alternative treatments.

The balloon is not intended to be used in case of obstructions by stones or malignancies.
