= Left atrial appendage occlusion =

Medical treatment

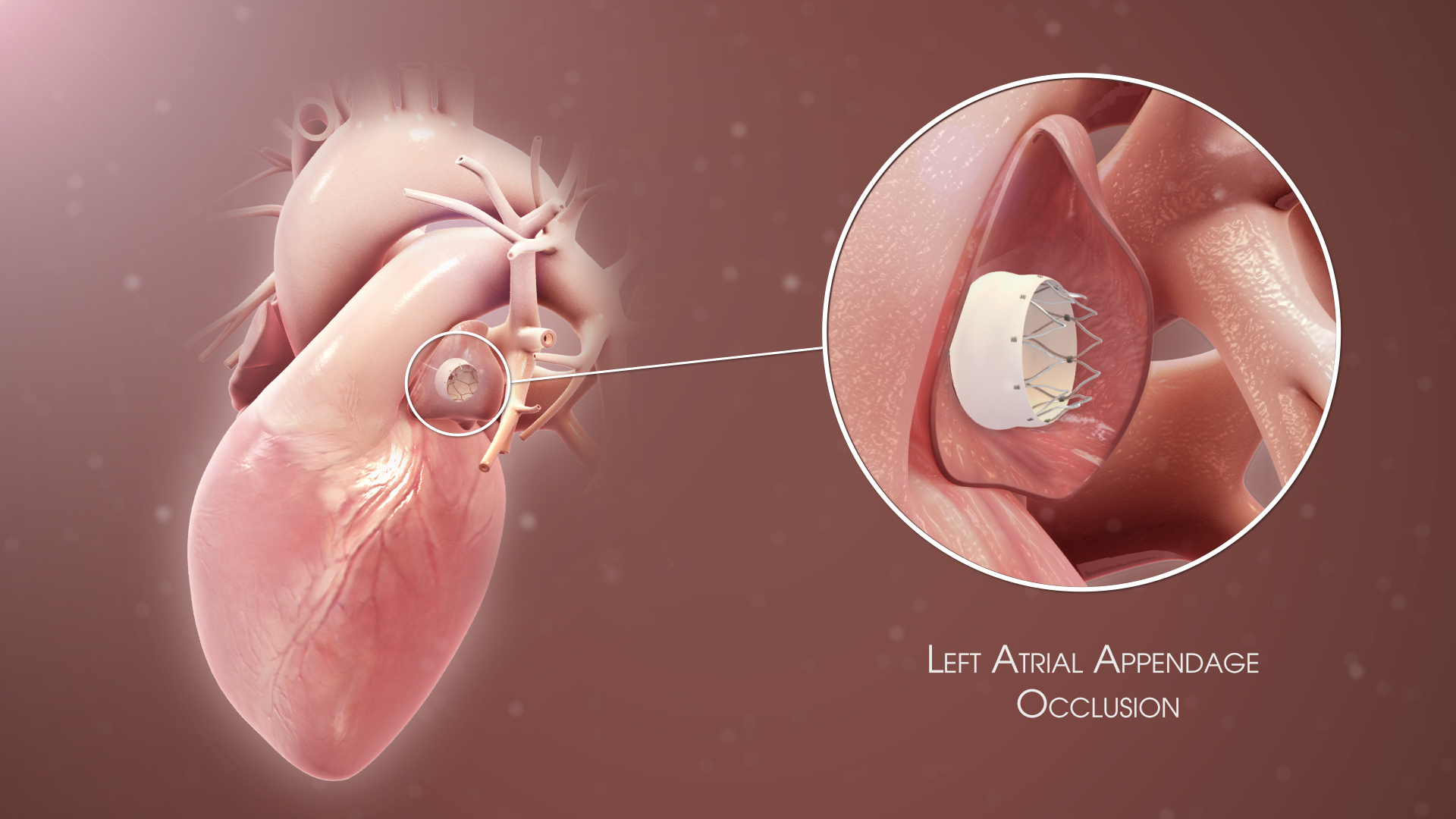
- A left atrial appendage occlusion method similar to the WATCHMAN device.
- ICD-9-CM: 37.36

Left atrial appendage occlusion (LAAO), also referred to as left atrial appendage closure (LAAC), is a procedure used to reduce the risk of blood clots from the left atrial appendage entering the bloodstream and causing a stroke in those with non-valvular atrial fibrillation (AF).

== Medical use ==
The most common treatment to decrease stroke risk in AF includes anticoagulation (blood-thinners). These medications, specifically direct oral anticoagulants (i.e. dabigatran, apixaban, rivaroxaban, edoxaban) and vitamin K antagonists (i.e. warfarin), are effective. Most can tolerate anticoagulation for years (and even decades) without serious side effects. However, there are certain individuals who are unable to tolerate anticoagulation, due for example bleeding risks. These people may be good candidates for LAAO:

- People with poor anticoagulation therapy compliance (approximately 45% of patients who are eligible for warfarin are not being treated, due to tolerance or adherence issues)
- People with intolerable side effects to anticoagulation therapy
- People with chronic thrombocytopenia (low platelets) or a known coagulation defect associated with bleeding
- People with a prior history of severe bleeding (e.g., intracranial hemorrhage, major gastrointestinal bleeding)
- People with a high risk of falling or a history of prior falls that resulted in injury
- People with AF that are already undergoing cardiac surgery for other indications

LAAO appears to be similar to DOACs with respect to effectiveness and safety.

== Rationale ==
The left atrial appendage is a pouch-like structure located in the upper part of the left atrium. Left atrial appendage occlusion (LAAO) is an alternative treatment to anticoagulation in a certain people with atrial fibrillation. Atrial fibrillation is characterized by an irregular and uncoordinated pumping function of the atria. This chaotic pattern of contraction can lead to reduced pumping efficiency and subsequent formation of blood clots, most notably in the left atrial appendage. Over 90% of stroke-causing clots that originate in the heart in non-valvular AF are formed in the left atrial appendage. LAAO does not completely eliminate the risk of stroke with AF but it does reduce the risk of stroke from emboli that originate in the left atrial appendage. The left atrial appendage can be purposefully occluded (i.e. closed) to help prevent the formation of clots in one of two ways.

1. The Lariat procedure is a surgical procedure that can be performed to ligate the left atrial appendage from outside the heart.
2. Endovascular implant is a catheter-based procedure used to place an occlusion device inside the orifice of the left atrial appendage.

== Devices and alternatives ==
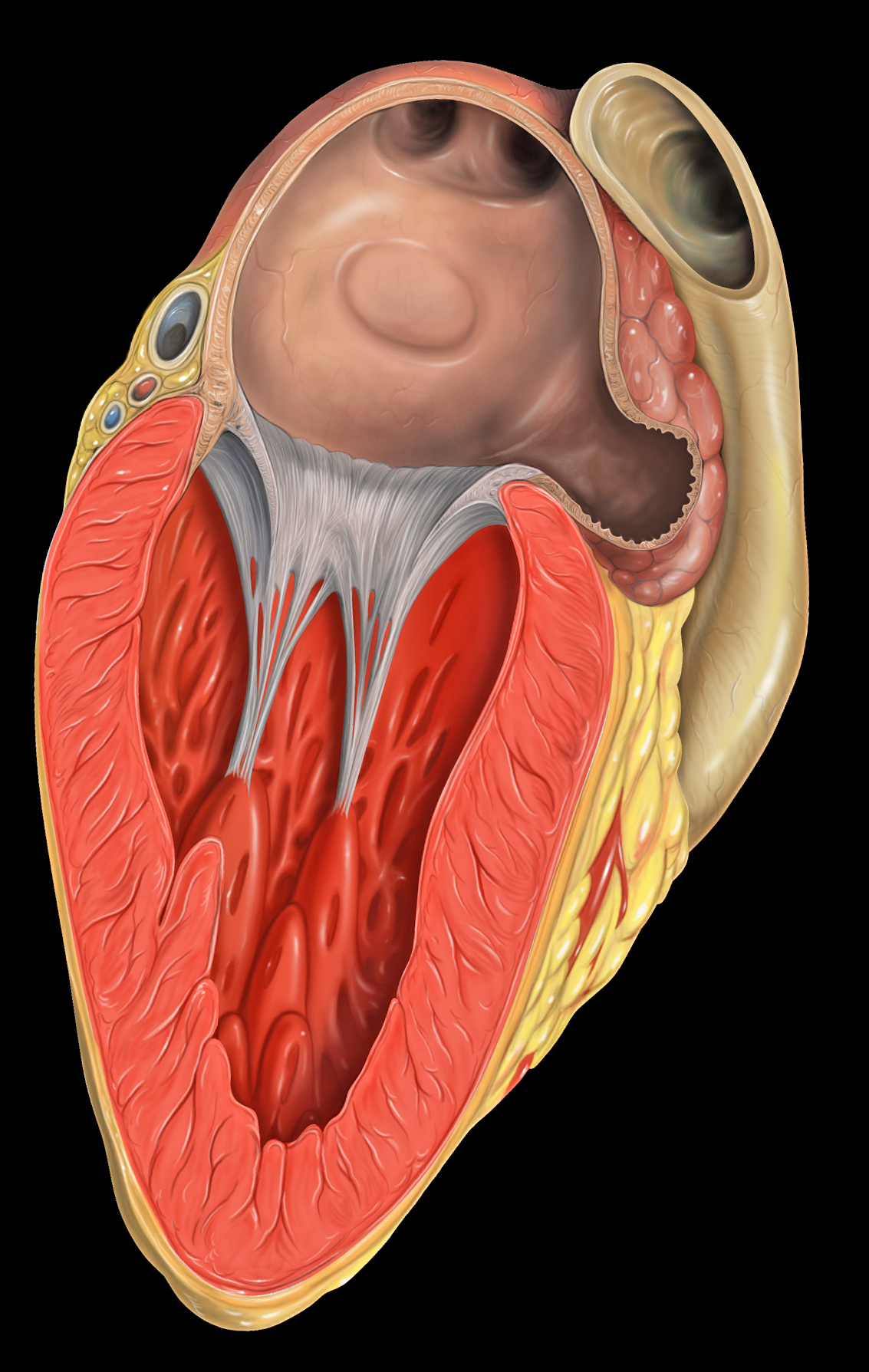
The left atrial appendage is the windsock-like structure shown to originate from the left atrium (3 o'clock)

=== Open surgery ===
==== Lariat procedure ====
Occlusion of the left atrial appendage can be achieved from outside the heart (the Lariat device) or from inside the heart (endovascular) with a blood-exposed implant (the Watchman and Amulet devices). The first method is a form of ligation that eliminates perfusion of the LAA. While effective in preventing many embolic strokes, it also negates the endocrine contribution (atrial natriuretic peptide) of the LAA. The second approach has many hazards as well but preserves the cardiac endocrine properties of the LAA. Further evaluation of both approaches is merited.

==== Over-sewing ====
The LAA can also be surgically removed simultaneously with other cardiac procedures such as the maze procedure or during mitral valve surgery; specifically, it can be occluded or excluded by over-sewing, excision and resection, ligation, stapling with or without amputation of the LAA or application of a clip system Finally, the left atrial appendage has been closed in a limited number of patients using a chest keyhole surgery approach.

==== Clip devices ====
LAA can also be occluded by the placement of clips such as the AtriClip or Penditure devices.

=== Catheter-based ===
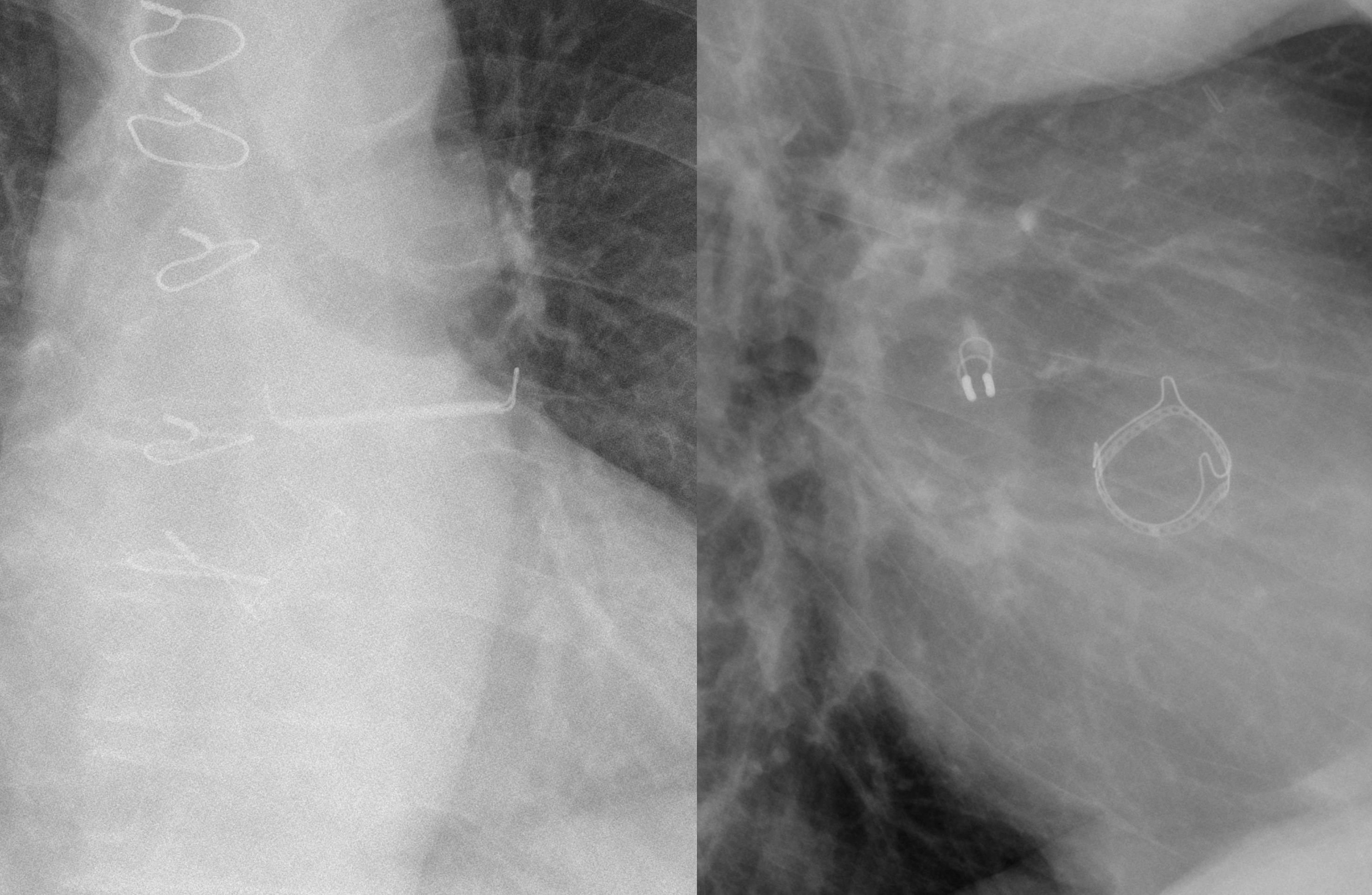
Radiograph showing an AtriClip attached to the left atrial appendage. Also visible is an aortic valve prosthesis.

==== Watchman device ====
In 2015, the United States approved the Watchman LAAC implant, to reduce the risk of thromboembolism from the left atrial appendage in patients with non-valvular AF who are at increased risk of stroke and have an appropriate reason to seek a non-drug alternative to blood thinning medications. The Watchman implant was studied in two randomized clinical trials and several clinical registries. The implant was approved in Europe in 2009.

The Watchman is a one-time implant typically performed under general anesthesia with transesophageal echo guidance (TEE). Similar to a stent procedure, the device is guided into the heart through a flexible tube (catheter) inserted through the femoral vein in the upper leg. The implant is introduced into the right atrium and is then passed into the left atrium through a hole in the septum that divides the two atria of the heart. This small hole in the septum usually disappears within six months. Once the position is confirmed, the implant is released and is left permanently fixed in the heart. The implant does not require open heart surgery and does not need to be replaced. Recovery typically takes twenty-four hours.

The patient continues taking warfarin with aspirin for 45 days post implantation at which point in time they return for a transesophageal echocardiography to judge completeness of the closure and the presence of blood clots. If the LAA is completely occluded, then the patient can stop taking warfarin and start clopidogrel and aspirin for six months after implant. At six months post implantation, it is recommended for the patient to continue taking aspirin indefinitely. In the PREVAIL clinical trial, 92% of patients stopped taking warfarin after 45 days and 99% discontinued warfarin at one year.

Another device termed PLAATO (percutaneous left atrial appendage transcatheter occlusion) was the first LAA occlusion device, although it is no longer being developed by its manufacturer (Appriva Medical, Inc. from Sunnyvale, California). In 210 patients receiving the PLAATO device, there was an estimated 61% reduction in the calculated stroke risk.

==== Amplatzer Amulet device ====
The Amplatzer device from St. Jude Medical, used to close atrial septal defects, has also been used to occlude the left atrial appendage. This can be performed without general anaesthesia and without echocardiographic guidance. Transcatheter patch obliteration of the LAA has also been reported. The Amulet device is inserted very similarly to the Watchman LAAC implant. A catheter is introduced into the groin and travels up to the heart where it crosses from the right atrium into the left atrium via a hole in the septum. The device is then discharged into the LAA. Eventually tissue grows over the Amulet device and completely occludes the LAA.

The ULTRASEAL LAA device, from Cardia, is a percutaneous, transcatheter device intended to prevent thrombus embolization from the left atrial appendage in patients who have non-valvular atrial fibrillation. As with all Cardia devices (such as: Atrial Septal Defect Closure Device or Patent Foramen Ovale Closure Device), the Ultraseal is fully retrievable and repositionable in the Cardia Delivery System used for deployment. The device can be retrieved and redeployed multiple times in a single procedure without replacing the device or delivery sheath.

Other devices exist to occlude the left atrial appendage from the inside of the heart such as the Wavecrest device and the Lariat device. The latter technique entails closing a strangling noose around the LAA, which is advanced from the chest wall with a special sheath, after introducing a balloon in the LAA from the inside surface of the heart (endocardium).

== Side effects ==
The main side effects related to these procedures include pericardial effusion, incomplete LAA closure, dislodgement of the device, blood clot formation on the device requiring prolonged oral anticoagulation, and the general risks of catheter-based techniques (such as air embolism). The left atrium anatomy can also preclude use of the device in some patients.

Theoretical concerns surround the role of the LAA in thirst regulation and water retention because it is an important source of atrial natriuretic factor. Preserving the right atrial appendage might attenuate this effect.
