= Automatic tachycardia =

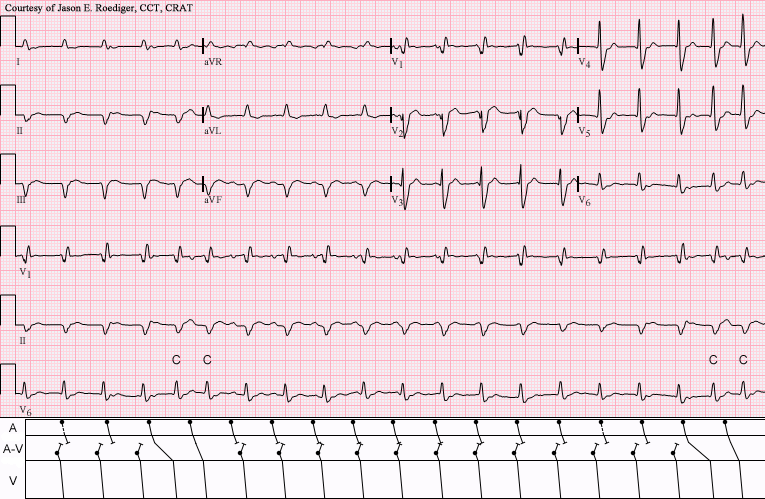
- Junctional tachycardia (rate about 115/min) dissociated from a slightly slower sinus tachycardia (rate about 107/min). Junctional tachycardia is both an SVT and an automatic tachycardia
- Types: Inappropriate sinus tachycardia, Supraventricular tachycardia, Ventricular tachycardia, Automatic junctional tachycardia, and Ectopic atrial tachycardia.

An automatic tachycardia is a cardiac arrhythmia which involves an area of the heart generating an abnormally fast rhythm, sometimes also called enhanced automaticity. These tachycardias, or fast heart rhythms, differ from reentrant tachycardias (AVRT and AVNRT) in which there is an abnormal electrical pathway which gives rise to the pathology. Most automatic tachycardias are supraventricular tachycardias (SVT). It is important to recognize an automatic tachycardia because the treatment will be different to that for a reentrant tachycardia. The most useful clue will be the presence of 'warm up' and 'cool down'. This means that whereas a reentrant tachycardia will both begin and end abruptly as cardiac conduction uses then ceases to use the accessory pathway, an automatic tachycardia will rise and fall gradually in rate as the automatic focus increases and decreases its automatic rate of electrical discharge.

== Types ==
=== Inappropriate sinus tachycardia ===
Inappropriate sinus tachycardia (IST) is defined as sinus tachycardia that is not caused by medical ailments, a physiological reaction, or pharmaceuticals and is accompanied by symptoms, frequently invalidating and affecting quality of life. IST symptoms include palpitations, chest discomfort, exhaustion, shortness of breath, presyncope, and syncope. The mechanisms of IST are poorly understood but it has been theorized that Intrinsic sinus node abnormality, beta-adrenergic receptor stimulating autoantibody, beta-adrenergic receptor supersensitivity, muscarinic receptor autoantibody or hyposensitivity, impaired baroreflex control, depressed efferent parasympathetic/vagal function, nociceptive stimulation, central autonomic overactivity, and abnormal neurohumoral modulation are all possible causes.

=== Supraventricular tachycardia ===
Supraventricular tachycardia (SVT) is an umbrella term for fast heart rhythms arising from the upper part of the heart. There are four main types of SVT: atrial fibrillation, atrial flutter, paroxysmal supraventricular tachycardia (PSVT), and Wolff–Parkinson–White syndrome. The symptoms of SVT include palpitations, feeling of faintness, sweating, shortness of breath, and/or chest pain.

=== Ventricular tachycardia ===
Ventricular tachycardia (V-tach or VT) is a fast heart rate arising from the lower chambers of the heart. Although a few seconds of VT may not result in permanent problems, longer periods are dangerous; and multiple episodes over a short period of time are referred to as an electrical storm. Short periods may occur without symptoms, or present with lightheadedness, palpitations, or chest pain. Ventricular tachycardia may result in ventricular fibrillation (VF) and turn into cardiac arrest. This conversion of the VT into VF is called the degeneration of the VT. It is found initially in about 7% of people in cardiac arrest.

=== Automatic junctional tachycardia ===
Automatic junctional tachycardia is a type of tachyarrhythmia that originates in the atrioventricular node and His bundle area. It can be referred to as junctional tachycardia, focal junctional tachycardia, or Junctional Ectopic Tachycardia (JET). Patients' heart rates are frequently between 200 and 250 beats per minute. Children are more likely to have automatic junctional tachycardia, which can be congenital or acquired postoperatively. The fundamental pathophysiology of automatic junctional tachycardia is thought to be abnormal and heightened automaticity.

=== Ectopic atrial tachycardia ===
Ectopic atrial tachycardia (EAT), also known as automatic atrial tachycardia, is an arrhythmia caused by both atria with abnormally fast atrial rates. The ectopic focus's firing rate is quicker than that of the sinus node, and it overrides normal sinus node activity. Heart rates in children and adolescents can range from 130 to 210 beats per minute but can exceed 300 bpm in babies.

== Treatment ==
Treatment depends on the origin of the automatic tachycardia. Inappropriate sinus tachycardia is a persistent medical problem that has a negative impact on one's quality of life. There are numerous therapeutic methods available, which are frequently paired with nonpharmacologic lifestyle and nutritional changes. Pharmacological treatment for IST focuses on modulating intrinsic or extrinsic pathways. The most common initial therapy is nonselective ß1 selective therapy; however, these drugs are poorly tolerated, even when their titration isn't restricted by hypotension or adverse effects. Ivabradine, an inhibitor of the Funny current, has shown tremendous promise in the treatment of IST, with trials demonstrating that it outperforms beta-blockade and other existing therapies in terms of both effectiveness and tolerability.

Episodes of Supraventricular tachycardia can be treated when they occur by Valsalva maneuver, adenosine injection or taking a AV node blocking agent as pill-in-pocket, but regular medication may also be used to prevent or reduce recurrence.

Therapy for Ventricular tachycardia may be directed either at terminating an episode of the abnormal heart rhythm or at reducing the risk of another VT episode. Individuals with pulseless VT or unstable VT are hemodynamically compromised and require immediate electric cardioversion to shock them out of the VT rhythm.

Automatic junctional tachycardia is treated clinically when there are symptoms, hemodynamic compromise, ventricular dysfunction, congestive heart failure, or evidence of hydrops in fetal cases. Amiodarone, beta-blockers, sotalol, flecainide, procainamide, digoxin, and anti-inflammatory agents such as steroids or even colchicine are recommended pharmacotherapy for the suppression of automatic junctional tachycardia.

== See also ==
- Cardiac ectopy
- Clinical cardiac electrophysiology
- Electrical conduction system of the heart
- Supraventricular tachycardia
