= Moracizine =

Chemical compound

Clinical data
- Trade names: Ethmozine
- Other names: Moricizine (USAN US)
- AHFS/Drugs.com: Consumer Drug Information
- MedlinePlus: a601214
- Pregnancy category: B (U.S.)
- ATC code: C01BG01 (WHO)

Pharmacokinetic data
- Bioavailability: 34–38%
- Protein binding: 95%
- Elimination half-life: 3–4 hours (healthy volunteers), 6–13 hours (cardiac disease)

Identifiers
- IUPAC name: ethyl [10-(3-morpholin-4-ylpropanoyl)-10H-phenothiazin-2-yl]carbamate
- CAS Number: 31883-05-3
- PubChem CID: 34633
- IUPHAR/BPS: 7244
- DrugBank: DB00680
- ChemSpider: 31872
- UNII: 2GT1D0TMX1
- KEGG: D05077
- ChEBI: CHEBI:6997
- ChEMBL: ChEMBL1075
- CompTox Dashboard (EPA): DTXSID4023335
- ECHA InfoCard: 100.046.216

Chemical and physical data
- Formula: C_{22}H_{25}N_{3}O_{4}S
- Molar mass: 427.52 g·mol^{−1}
- 3D model (JSmol): Interactive image
- SMILES: O=C(OCC)Nc2cc1N(c3c(Sc1cc2)cccc3)C(=O)CCN4CCOCC4
- InChI: InChI=1S/C22H25N3O4S/c1-2-29-22(27)23-16-7-8-20-18(15-16)25(17-5-3-4-6-19(17)30-20)21(26)9-10-24-11-13-28-14-12-24/h3-8,15H,2,9-14H2,1H3,(H,23,27); Key:FUBVWMNBEHXPSU-UHFFFAOYSA-N

Moracizine or moricizine, sold under the trade name Ethmozine, is an antiarrhythmic of class IC. It was used for the prophylaxis and treatment of serious and life-threatening ventricular arrhythmias, but was withdrawn in 2007 for commercial reasons.

== Pharmacology ==
Moracizine, a phenothiazine derivative, undergoes extensive first-pass metabolism and is also extensively metabolized after it has entered the circulation. It may have pharmacologically active metabolites. A clinical study has shown that moracizine is slightly less effective than encainide or flecainide in suppressing ventricular premature depolarizations. Compared with disopyramide and quinidine, moracizine was equally or more effective in suppressing premature ventricular contractions, couplets, and nonsustained ventricular tachycardia.

In the Cardiac Arrhythmia Suppression Trial (CAST), a large study testing the influence of antiarrhythmics on mortality, showed a statistically non-significant increase of mortality from 5.4 to 7.2% under moracizine. This is in line with other class IC antiarrhythmics.

== Synthesis ==

The reaction between N-phenyl-1,3-benzenediamine (1) and ethyl chloroformate (2) gives the carbamate (3). Treatment with sulfur and iodine forms the phenothiazine derivative (4). Amide formation with 3-chloropropionyl chloride (5) gives the penultimate intermediate (6). Alkylation of morpholine by nucleophilic substitution at the sidechain chlorine yields moricizine.

== See also ==
- Ethacizine
- List of Russian drugs
