= Jeremy N. Ruskin =

USA Cardiologist

- Born: October 19, 1945 (age 81)
- Citizenship: United States
- Education: Tufts University (B.S., 1967); Harvard Medical School (M.D., 1971)
- Known for: Founder, Massachusetts General Hospital Cardiac Arrhythmia Service and Clinical Electrophysiology Laboratory
- Title: Professor of Medicine, Harvard Medical School; Founder and Director Emeritus, Cardiac Arrhythmia Service and Clinical Electrophysiology Laboratory, Massachusetts General Hospital; Founder and Director Emeritus, MGH Clinical Cardiac Electrophysiology Fellowship Training Program; Omran Alomran Endowed Chair in Cardiology, Massachusetts General Hospital
- Scientific career
- Fields: Cardiac electrophysiology; Cardiology; Arrhythmia; Cardiovascular disease
- Workplaces: Massachusetts General Hospital; Harvard Medical School

Jeremy N. Ruskin (born October 19, 1945) is an American cardiologist, medical researcher, and teacher specializing in cardiac electrophysiology, a subspecialty of cardiology. He is Professor of Medicine at Harvard Medical School, Founder and Director Emeritus of the Cardiac Arrhythmia Service and Clinical Electrophysiology Laboratory, Founder and Director Emeritus of the Clinical Cardiac Electrophysiology Fellowship Training Program, and inaugural incumbent of the Omran Alomran Endowed Chair in Cardiology at Massachusetts General Hospital. He is also Founder and Director of the International (Boston) Atrial Fibrillation Symposium.

== Contents ==
1. Education
2. Career
3. Awards
4. Selected publications

== Education ==
Ruskin received his undergraduate degree summa cum laude from Tufts University in 1967. He received his medical degree cum laude from Harvard Medical School in 1971. He completed a residency in internal medicine at Beth Israel Hospital in Boston from 1971 to 1973.

From 1973 to 1975, Ruskin completed his training in clinical cardiac electrophysiology at the Staten Island Public Health Service Hospital / U.S. Marine Hospital in Staten Island, New York, under the mentorship of Dr. Anthony Damato. He then completed a Clinical and Research Fellowship in Cardiovascular Disease at Massachusetts General Hospital from 1975 to 1978. He joined the MGH and Harvard faculty in 1978.

== Career ==
=== Founding of the MGH Cardiac Arrhythmia Service ===
In 1978, Ruskin founded the MGH Cardiac Arrhythmia Service and Clinical Electrophysiology Laboratory, the first subspecialty service dedicated to the care of patients with cardiac arrhythmias in New England. In the same year, he also founded the MGH Fellowship Training Program in Clinical Cardiac Electrophysiology, described as the first such subspecialty training program on cardiac arrhythmias in New England.

=== Research ===
Ruskin's research has addressed the role of electrophysiologic testing in survivors of cardiac arrest; the proarrhythmic effects of cardiac and noncardiac drugs; the role of electrophysiologic testing in patients with unexplained syncope; novel approaches to antiarrhythmic drug therapy; nonpharmacological therapies for ventricular arrhythmias and atrial fibrillation; experimental animal models of post-infarction ventricular tachycardia; the use of novel bioadhesives for myocardial preservation in experimental myocardial infarction; and the cardiovascular effects of psychedelics.

He is an author of more than 500 original scientific publications, chapters, reviews, guidelines, and monographs.

=== FDA advisory service ===
Ruskin served as a member of the United States FDA Cardiovascular and Renal Drugs Advisory Committee for five years.

=== International Atrial Fibrillation Symposium ===
In 1995, Ruskin founded the Annual International Atrial Fibrillation Symposium, which he has directed since its inception.

=== Professional memberships ===
Ruskin is a member of the Heart Rhythm Society and a Fellow of the American College of Physicians, the American Heart Association, and the American College of Cardiology.

== Awards ==
Year	Award
1981–1986	American Heart Association Established Investigator Award
1997	Michel Mirowski Award for Excellence in Clinical Cardiology and Electrophysiology
2002	Heart Rhythm Society Pioneer in Pacing and Electrophysiology Award
2015	KCHRS Pioneer in Electrophysiology Award
2016	Omran Alomran Endowed Chair in Cardiology at Massachusetts General Hospital (inaugural incumbent)
2016	Jeremy Ruskin, MD and Dan Starks Endowed Chair in Cardiology established at Massachusetts General Hospital
2018	William Silen Lifetime Achievement in Mentoring Award, Harvard Medical School
2022	Heart Rhythm Society Distinguished Teacher Award
2024	Honorary Doctor of Science degree, Tufts University

== Selected publications ==
- Ruskin JN; DiMarco JP; Garan H (1980). "Out-of-hospital cardiac arrest: electrophysiologic observations and selection of long-term antiarrhythmic drug therapy". New England Journal of Medicine. 303: 607–613. doi:10.1056/NEJM198009113031103.
- Garan H; Fallon JT; Ruskin JN (1980). "Sustained ventricular tachycardia in recent canine myocardial infarction". Circulation. 62: 980–987. doi:10.1161/01.cir.62.5.980.
- Ruskin JN; DiMarco JP; Garan H (1981). "Repetitive ventricular responses to single ventricular extrastimuli in patients with serious ventricular arrhythmias: Incidence and clinical significance". Circulation. 63: 767–772. PMID 7471331.
- DiMarco JP; et al. (1981). "Intracardiac electrophysiologic techniques in recurrent syncope of unknown cause". Annals of Internal Medicine. 95: 542–548. PMID 7294543.
- Ruskin JN; et al. (1983). "Antiarrhythmic drugs — a potential cause of out-of-hospital cardiac arrest". New England Journal of Medicine. 309: 1302–1306.
- Garan H; Ruskin JN (1984). "Localized reentry: a mechanism of induced sustained ventricular tachycardia in a canine model of recent myocardial infarction". Journal of Clinical Investigation. 74: 377–392. PMID 6746899.
- Reddy VY; et al. (2004). "Integration of cardiac magnetic resonance imaging with three-dimensional electroanatomic mapping to guide left ventricular catheter manipulation: feasibility in a porcine model of healed myocardial infarction". Journal of the American College of Cardiology. 44 (11): 2202–2213.
- Packer D; et al. (2013). "Cryo Balloon Ablation of Pulmonary Veins for Paroxysmal Atrial Fibrillation: First Results of the North American Arctic Front STOP AF Pivotal Trial". Journal of the American College of Cardiology. 61 (16). PMID 23500312.
- Kalantarian S; et al. (2013). "Cognitive impairment associated with atrial fibrillation: a meta-analysis". Annals of Internal Medicine. 158: 338–346. doi:10.7326/0003-4819-158-5-201303050-00007. PMC 4465526.
- Ptaszek LM; et al. (2020). "Gelatin Methacryloyl Bioadhesive Improves Survival and Reduces Scar Burden in a Mouse Model of Myocardial Infarction". Journal of the American Heart Association. 9 (11): e014199. PMID 32458746.
- Ruskin JN; et al. (2020). "How a concentration-effect analysis of data from the eliglustat thorough electrocardiographic study was used to support dosing recommendations". Molecular Genetics and Metabolism. 131 (1–2): 211–218. PMID 33012655.
- Khaloo P; et al. (2022). "Distinct etiologies of high-sensitivity troponin T elevation predict different mortality risks for patients hospitalized with COVID-19". International Journal of Cardiology. 351: 118–125. PMID 34952038.
- Ruskin JN; et al. (2024). "Orally Inhaled Flecainide for Conversion of Atrial Fibrillation to Sinus Rhythm: INSTANT Phase 2 Trial". JACC Clinical Electrophysiology. doi:10.1016/j.jacep.2024.02.021. hdl:11370/579b94fc-c4db-438a-b536-bb05b31bd694. PMID 38613545.
- Nahlawi A; Ptaszek LM; Ruskin JN (2025). "Cardiovascular effects and safety of classic psychedelics". Nature Cardiovascular Research. 4 (2): 131–144. doi:10.1038/s44161-025-00608-2. PMID 39910289.
