= XEN-D0101 =

Chemical compound

Legal status
- Legal status: Investigational

Identifiers
- IUPAC name: N-(2-hydroxyethyl)-1-[5-phenyl-4-(pyridin-2-ylmethylamino)thieno[2,3-d]pyrimidin-2-yl]piperidine-3-carboxamide
- CAS Number: 1410180-30-1
- PubChem CID: 70811211

Chemical and physical data
- Formula: C_{26}H_{28}N_{6}O_{2}S
- Molar mass: 488.61 g·mol^{−1}

XEN-D0101 is an experimental drug that was developed to treat atrial fibrillation. Xention, a biopharmaceutical company based in Cambridge, England, created XEN-D0101 along with other ion channel-modulating drugs. XEN-D0101 is a selective antagonist of the voltage-gated potassium channel Kv1.5. Atrial fibrillation is the main focus of Xention’s drug development, as it is the most common cardiac arrhythmia (irregular heart beat) seen in patients.

== Atrial fibrillation ==
Atrial fibrillation (AF) is an arrhythmia that occurs in 1-2% of the general population. AF is linked to several cardiac causes including hypertension and coronary artery disease, and AF increases the risk for stroke. Current strategies to manage AF are effective but many are associated with adverse side effects. Due to the irregular rhythm occurring in the atria, targeting them with antiarrhythmic drugs without affecting the ventricles would provide a desirable outcome.

== Mechanism of action ==
A recognized atrial selective drug target is Kv1.5, which is found in atria but not in ventricles. Kv1.5 carries the ultra rapid delayed rectifier current known as Ikur. In a normal heart, the atria depolarize and repolarize in a very organized fashion. During atrial fibrillation, this process becomes chaotic and the atrial depolarization occurs faster than it should causing the irregular heart beat and impaired atrial contraction. XEN-D0101 is a Kv1.5 antagonist that selectively prolongs the atrial refractory period. By prolonging the refractory period XEN-D0101 allows the atria to fully relax and not contract prematurely. XEN-D0101 selectively increases atrial refractory period by 22% in dogs with atrial tachycardia induced electrical remodeling. XEN-D0101 differs from other AF drugs in that it doesn’t effect ventricular contraction, as determined by assessing the QT interval on an echocardiogram. The QT interval represents ventricular depolarization and repolarization, and XEN-D0101 did not significantly increase the timing of this interval.
