= Ethacizine =

Chemical compound

Clinical data
- Trade names: Ethacizin
- AHFS/Drugs.com: International Drug Names
- ATC code: C01BC09 (WHO)

Legal status
- Legal status: Prescription only (RU)

Pharmacokinetic data
- Bioavailability: ~40% (oral)
- Protein binding: 90%
- Metabolism: Extensive hepatic
- Elimination half-life: 2.5 hours

Identifiers
- IUPAC name: ethyl N-[10-[3-(diethylamino)propanoyl]phenothiazin-2-yl]carbamate
- CAS Number: 33414-33-4
- PubChem CID: 107841
- ChemSpider: 96982
- UNII: FE5SPV1Z6G
- KEGG: D10503
- ChEMBL: ChEMBL1997663
- CompTox Dashboard (EPA): DTXSID50187057

Chemical and physical data
- Formula: C_{22}H_{27}N_{3}O_{3}S
- Molar mass: 413.54 g·mol^{−1}
- 3D model (JSmol): Interactive image
- SMILES: CCN(CC)CCC(=O)N1C2=CC=CC=C2SC3=C1C=C(C=C3)NC(=O)OCC
- InChI: InChI=1S/C22H27N3O3S/c1-4-24(5-2)14-13-21(26)25-17-9-7-8-10-19(17)29-20-12-11-16(15-18(20)25)23-22(27)28-6-3/h7-12,15H,4-6,13-14H2,1-3H3,(H,23,27); Key:PQXGNJKJMFUPPM-UHFFFAOYSA-N

Ethacizine (ethacyzine) is a class Ic antiarrhythmic agent, related to moracizine. It is used in Russia and some other CIS countries for the treatment of severe and/or refractory ventricular and supraventricular arrhythmias, especially those accompanied by organic heart disease. It is also indicated as a treatment of refractory tachycardia associated with Wolff–Parkinson–White syndrome.

It is manufactured under the brand name Ethacizin (Этацизин) by Latvian pharmaceutical company Olainfarm.

== Synthesis ==
For the treatment of heart infarction:

Synthesis: Patent:

The amide formation between Phenothiazine-2-ethylcarbamate [37711-29-8] (1) and 3-Chloropropionyl chloride [625-36-5] (2) gives ethyl N-[10-(3-chloropropanoyl)phenothiazin-2-yl]carbamate [119407-03-3] [34749-22-9] (3). Displacement of the remaining ω-halogen by diethylamine (4) then completes the synthesis of ethacizine (5).

== See also ==
- List of Russian drugs
