= Junctional ectopic tachycardia =

Irregular heartbeat due to abnormal conduction from the atrioventricular nerve

- Other names: His bundle tachycardia
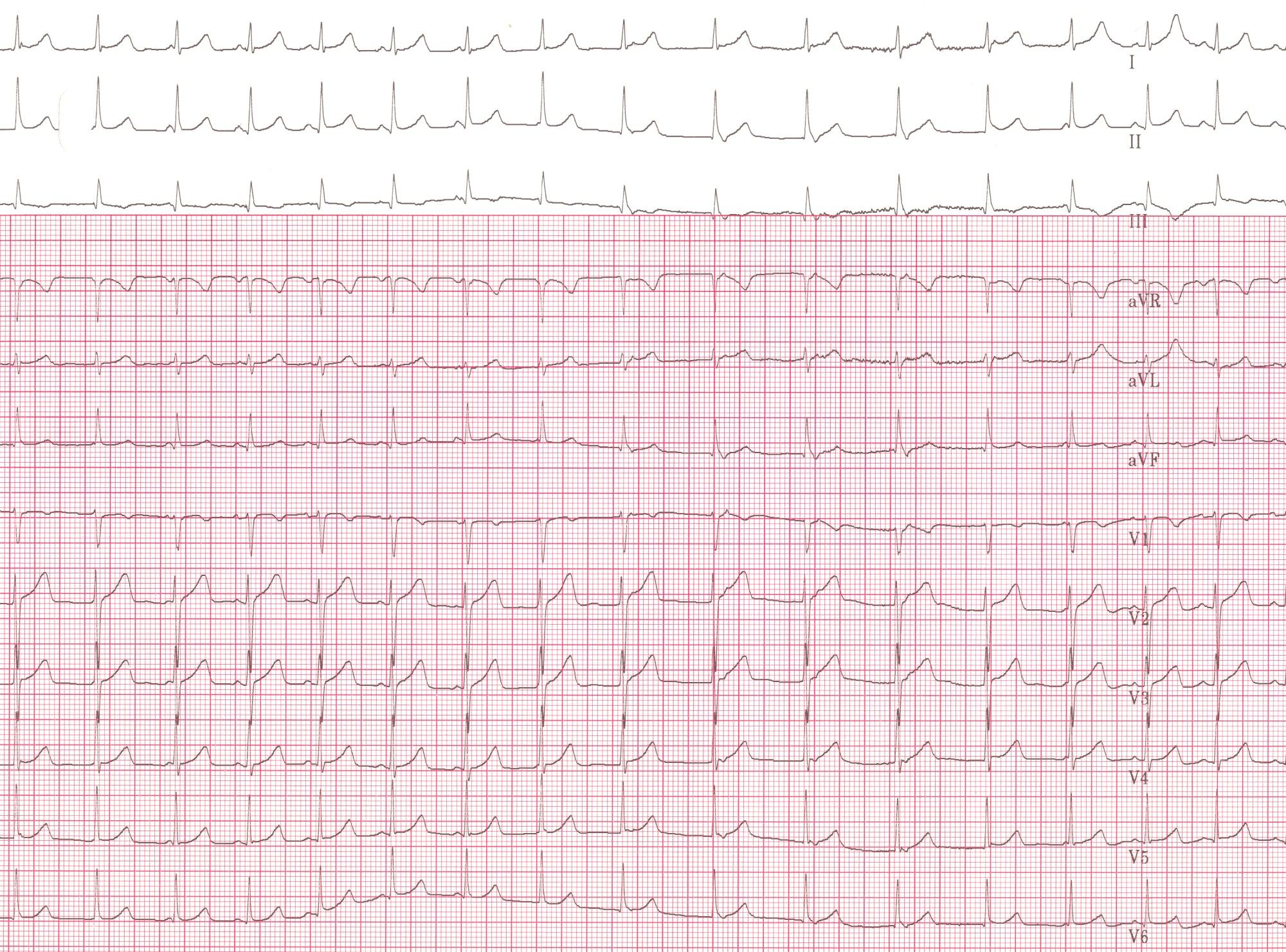
- Specialty: Cardiology
- Causes: Post-cardiac surgery
- Differential diagnosis: AV nodal re-entrant tachycardia
- Treatment: Correction of acidosis and electrolyte disturbances, antiarrhythmic medication, catheter ablation
- Medication: Amiodarone, propranolol, verapamil, flecainide, propafenone, adenosin.

Junctional ectopic tachycardia (JET) is a rare syndrome of the heart that manifests in patients recovering from heart surgery. It is characterized by cardiac arrhythmia, or irregular beating of the heart, caused by abnormal conduction from or through the atrioventricular node (AV node). In newborns and infants up to 6 weeks old, the disease may also be referred to as His bundle tachycardia or congenital JET.

== Pathophysiology ==
In normal individuals, electrical activity in the heart is initiated in the sinoatrial (SA) node (located in the right atrium), propagates to the atrioventricular (AV) node, and then through the bundle of His to the ventricles of the heart.

The AV node acts as a gatekeeper, limiting the electrical activity that reaches the ventricles of the heart. This function of the AV node is important, because if the signals generated in the atria of the heart were to increase in rate (as they do during atrial fibrillation or atrial flutter), the AV node will limit the electrical activity that conducts to the ventricles. For instance, if the atria are electrically activated at 300 beats per minute, half those electrical impulses are blocked by the AV node, so that the ventricles are activated at 150 beats per minute (giving a pulse of 150 beats per minute). Another important property of the AV node is that it slows down individual electrical impulses. This is manifest on the ECG as the PR interval, which is about less than 200 milliseconds, the time from activation of the atria (manifest as the P wave) and activation of the ventricles (manifest as the QRS complex).

Individuals with JET have a "short-circuit" in their heart, where the electricity bypasses the AV node, causing the heart to beat faster than normal. The cause of the arrhythmia, the ectopic focus, is usually near the AV node in the triangle of Koch (a rough triangle with points at the coronary sinus, the tendon of Todaro, and the tricuspid valve).

Patients of heart surgery may experience an accelerated narrow complex tachycardia, usually within the first 24–48 hours (but occasionally longer) after surgery. There may be atrio-ventricular disassociation with more ventricular signals than atrial signals. The cause of JET is felt to be due to manipulation of the tissue surrounding the AV node during surgery, however debate exists regarding the exact cause, as it is seen after procedures even without significant manipulation of this area.

JET-like symptoms can also manifest congenitally and in the first six months of life. This syndrome, which may also referred to as His bundle tachycardia, is resistant to therapy and can be difficult to treat.

== Diagnosis ==
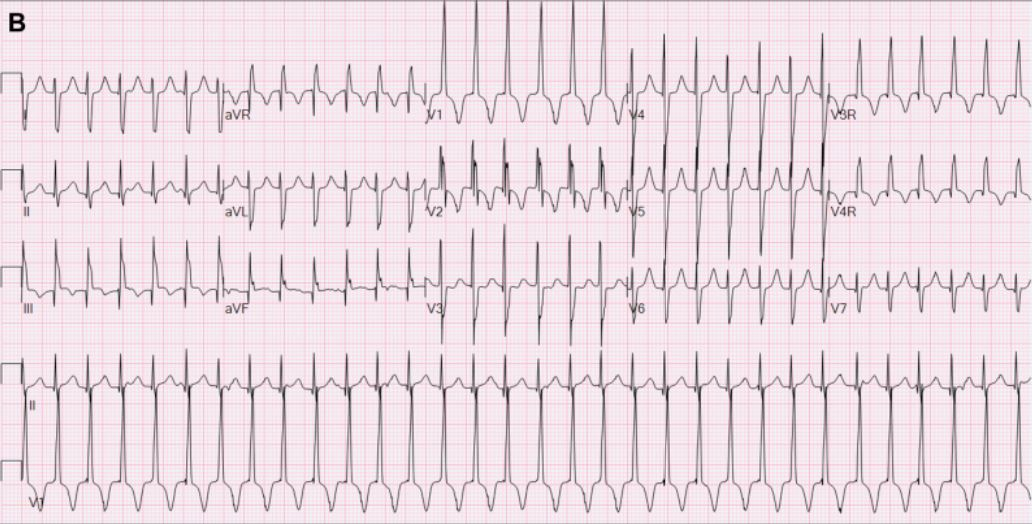
JET in a 2-month-old girl following cardiac surgery. In this case the right bundle branch block was present during tachycardia and during normal sinus rhythm.

JET is most commonly diagnosed using a 12-lead ECG. The appearance is usually of a tachycardia with rapid, regular ventricular rates of 170-260 beats per minute. The QRS complexes are usually narrow, but may be broad if a bundle branch block is present. There may a 1:1 relationship between atria and ventricular activity with a short RP interval, or atrioventricular dissociation with slower atrial than ventricular rates if the AV node is unable to conduct from the ventricles to the atria.

The differential diagnosis of JET includes other forms of supraventricular tachycardia, most commonly atrioventricular nodal reentrant tachycardia (AVNRT). These can be distinguished using adenosine. The response to adenosine in JET is a temporary loss of conduction to the atria leading to continuation of the tachycardia but with atrioventricular dissociation. In contrast, administration of adenosine in AVNRT will usually terminate the arrhythmia. The diagnosis can be conclusively proven by performing an invasive electrophysiological study.

== Treatment ==
Treatment is aimed at slowing the rate by correcting acidosis, correcting electrolytes (especially magnesium and calcium), cooling the patient, and antiarrhythmic medications. Occasionally pacing of the atrium at a rate higher than the JET may allow improved cardiac function by allowing atrial and ventricular synchrony.

Medications used to treat JET include beta-adrenoceptor blockers such as propranolol, calcium channel antagonists such as verapamil, and antiarrhythmics such as flecainide, amiodarone, and propafenone. Amiodarone is frequently used in the short term in children experiencing JET following heart surgery, although propanolol, flecainide and propafenone are more commonly recommended for long term use due to the frequency of side effects associated with amiodarone.

In those who experience recurrent episodes of JET, an alternative to long term medical therapy is catheter ablation. In this procedure, the small area in which the cells initiating JET are found can be destroyed by heating or freezing the tissue. This is accomplished using wires passed to the heart via the femoral vein through a small puncture in the groin. The main risk of this procedure is accidental damage to the AV node. This occurs more frequently when treating JET than other forms of supraventricular tachycardia, requiring treatment with a pacemaker in 5-10% of ablations for JET. The risk is lower if the tissue is frozen rather than heated.

For those at risk of developing JET such as children undergoing heart surgery, treatment can also be given prophylactically. A meta-analysis of 9 studies found that sedation with dexmedetomidine reduced the risk of JET occurring post-operatively.

== Epidemiology ==
JET is most commonly seen in children following cardiac surgery. The arrhythmia affects 2-22% of children depending on the type of surgery performed, with higher rates seen following repair of Tetralogy of Fallot, and lower rates following the repair of ventricular septal defects and arterial switch operations.

== Etymology ==
Junctional ectopic tachycardia derives its name from the problem it causes. "Junctional" is used as the abnormal tissue driving the ventricular rate is located close junction between the atria and ventricles, known as the AV node. Ectopic (from the Greek ektopos, meaning "out of place") refers to the fact that the ventricles are being triggered by tissue that is not the normal pacemaker tissue within the heart. Tachycardia (from the Greek takhys, meaning "swift", and kardia, meaning heart) means a swift heart rate.

By this definition, junctional ectopic tachycardia is an abnormally swift heart rhythm due to cells firing within the heart near the AV node.
