= Cardioversion =

Electrical shock or medications to interrupt cardiac arrhythmia

- Illustration of cardioversion
- Specialty: Cardiology
- ICD-9-CM: 99.6
- MeSH: D004554
- MedlinePlus: 007110

Cardioversion is a medical procedure by which an abnormally fast heart rate (tachycardia) or other cardiac arrhythmia is converted to a normal rhythm using electricity or drugs.

Synchronized electrical cardioversion uses a therapeutic dose of electric current to the heart at a specific moment in the cardiac cycle, restoring the activity of the electrical conduction system of the heart. (Defibrillation uses a therapeutic dose of electric current to the heart at a random moment in the cardiac cycle, and is the most effective resuscitation measure for cardiac arrest associated with ventricular fibrillation and pulseless ventricular tachycardia.) Pharmacological cardioversion, also called chemical cardioversion, uses antiarrhythmia medication instead of an electrical shock.

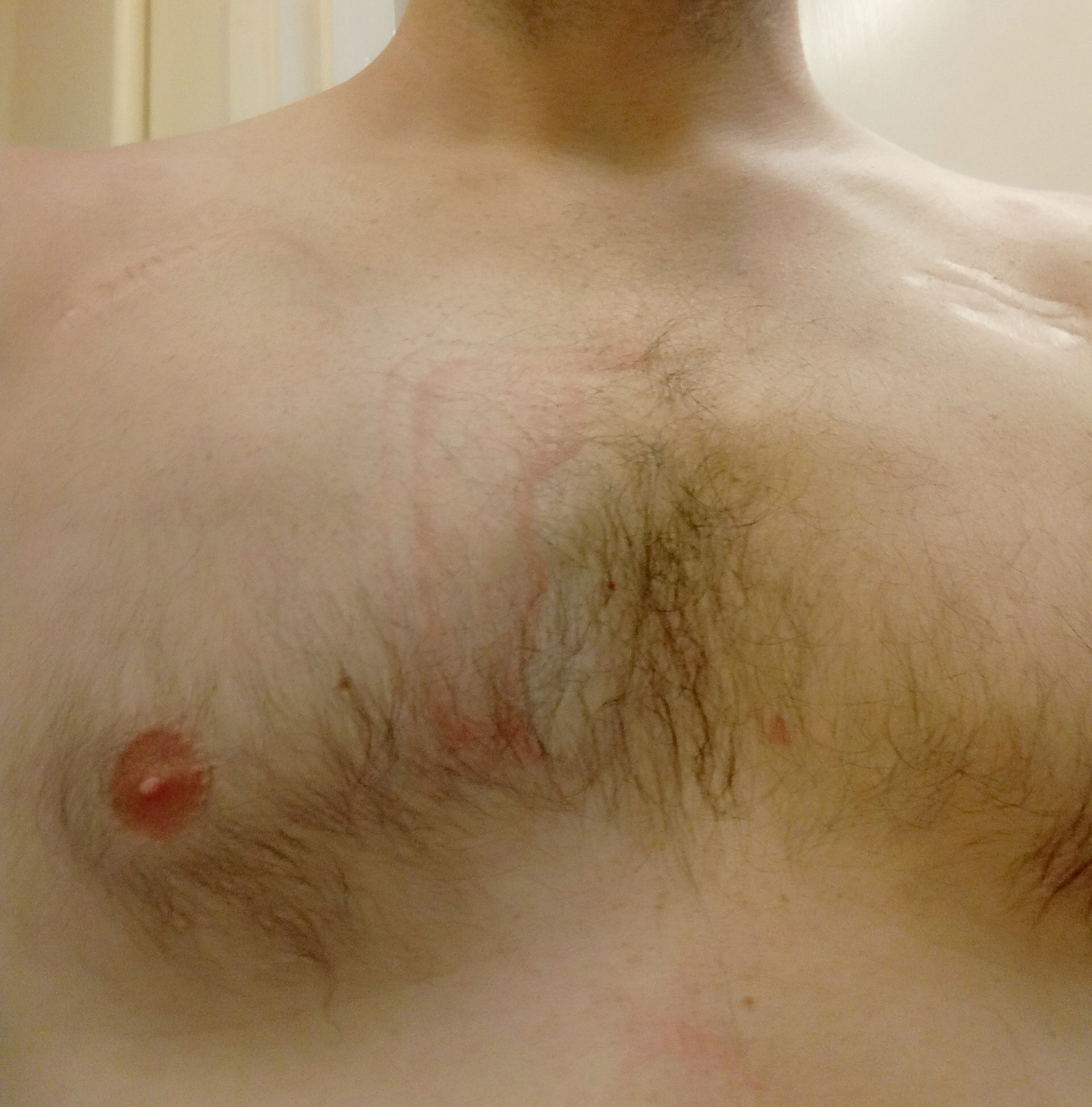
'Burn' mark remaining one day after DC electrical cardioversion

== Electrical ==
To perform synchronized electrical cardioversion, two electrode pads are used (or, alternatively, the traditional hand-held "paddles"), each comprising a metallic plate which is faced with a saline based conductive gel. The pads are placed on the chest of the patient, or one is placed on the chest and one on the back. These are connected by cables to a machine which has the combined functions of an ECG display screen and the electrical function of a defibrillator. A synchronizing function (either manually operated or automatic) allows the cardioverter to deliver a reversion shock, by way of the pads, of a selected amount of electric current over a predefined number of milliseconds at the optimal moment in the cardiac cycle which corresponds to the R wave of the QRS complex on the ECG.

Timing the shock to the R wave prevents the delivery of the shock during the vulnerable period (or relative refractory period) of the cardiac cycle, which could induce ventricular fibrillation. If the patient is conscious, various drugs are often used to help sedate the patient and make the procedure more tolerable. However, if the patient is hemodynamically unstable or unconscious, the shock is given immediately upon confirmation of the arrhythmia. When synchronized electrical cardioversion is performed as an elective procedure, the shocks can be performed in conjunction with drug therapy until sinus rhythm is attained. After the procedure, the patient is monitored to ensure stability of the sinus rhythm.

Synchronized electrical cardioversion is used to treat hemodynamically unstable supraventricular (or narrow complex) tachycardias, including atrial fibrillation and atrial flutter. It is also used in the emergent treatment of wide complex tachycardias, including ventricular tachycardia, when a pulse is present. Pulseless ventricular tachycardia and ventricular fibrillation are treated with unsynchronized shocks referred to as defibrillation. Electrical therapy is inappropriate for sinus tachycardia, which should always be a part of the differential diagnosis.

== Medication ==
Various antiarrhythmic agents can be used to return the heart to normal sinus rhythm. Pharmacological cardioversion is an especially good option in patients with atrial fibrillation of recent onset. Drugs that are effective at maintaining normal rhythm after electric cardioversion can also be used for pharmacological cardioversion. Drugs like amiodarone, diltiazem, verapamil and metoprolol are frequently given before electrical cardioversion to decrease the heart rate, stabilize the patient and increase the chance that cardioversion is successful. There are various classes of agents that are most effective for pharmacological cardioversion.

Class I agents are sodium (Na) channel blockers (which slow conduction by blocking the Na+ channel) and are divided into 3 subclasses a, b and c. Class Ia slows phase 0 depolarization in the ventricles and increases the absolute refractory period. Procainamide, quinidine and disopyramide are Class Ia agents. Class 1b drugs lengthen phase 3 repolarization. They include lidocaine, mexiletine and phenytoin. Class Ic greatly slow phase 0 depolarization in the ventricles (however unlike 1a have no effect on the refractory period). Flecainide, moricizine and propafenone are Class Ic agents.

Class II agents are beta blockers which inhibit SA and AV node depolarization and slow heart rate. They also decrease cardiac oxygen demand and can prevent cardiac remodeling. Not all beta blockers are the same; some are cardio selective (affecting only beta 1 receptors) while others are non-selective (affecting beta 1 and 2 receptors). Beta blockers that target the beta-1 receptor are called cardio selective because beta-1 is responsible for increasing heart rate; hence a beta blocker will slow the heart rate.

Class III agents (prolong repolarization by blocking outward K+ current): amiodarone and sotalol are effective class III agents. Ibutilide is another Class III agent but has a different mechanism of action (acts to promote influx of sodium through slow-sodium channels). It has been shown to be effective in acute cardioversion of recent-onset atrial fibrillation and atrial flutter.

Class IV drugs are calcium (Ca) channel blockers. They work by inhibiting the action potential of the SA and AV nodes.

If the patient is stable, adenosine may be used for restoration of sinus rhythm in patients with macro-reentrant supraventricular tachycardias. It causes a short-lived cessation of conduction through the atrio-ventricular node breaking the circus movement through the node and the macro-reentrant pathway restoring sinus rhythm.

== Procedure ==
=== Preparation ===
Cardioversion for restoration of sinus rhythm from an atrial rhythm is largely a scheduled procedure. In addition to cardiology, anesthesiology is also usually involved to ensure comfort of the patient for the duration of the shock therapy. The presence of registered nurses, physician associates, or other medical personnel may also be helpful during the procedure.

Before starting the procedure, the patient's chest and back will be prepped for electrode placement. The skin should be free of any oily substances (e.g., lotions) and hair which may otherwise interfere with adhesion of the pads. Once this is complete, the medical team will adhere the pads to the patient using a rolling motion to ensure the absence of air pockets. (see details on pad placement below). The anesthesiology team will then administer a general anesthetic (e.g., propofol) in order to ensure patient comfort and amnesia during the procedure. Opioid analgesics (e.g., fentanyl) may be combined with propofol, although anesthesiology must weigh the benefits against adverse effects including apnea. Bite blocks and extremity restraints are then utilized to prevent self-injury during cardioversion. Once these medications are administered, the glabellar reflex or eyelash reflex may be used to determine the patient's level of consciousness.

The pads are connected to a machine that can interpret the patient's cardiac rate and rhythm and deliver a shock at the appropriate time. The machine should synchronize ('sync') with the R wave of the rhythm strip. Although uncommon, sometimes the machine will unintentionally sync to high amplitude T waves, so it is important to ensure that the machine is synced appropriately to R waves. Interpretation of the patient's rhythm is imperative when using cardioversion to restore sinus rhythm from less emergent arrhythmias where a pulse is present (e.g., atrial flutter, atrial fibrillation). However, if a patient is confirmed to be in pulseless ventricular tachycardia "v-tach" or ventricular fibrillation "v-fib", then a shock is delivered immediately upon connection of the pads. In this application, electrical cardioversion is more properly termed defibrillation.

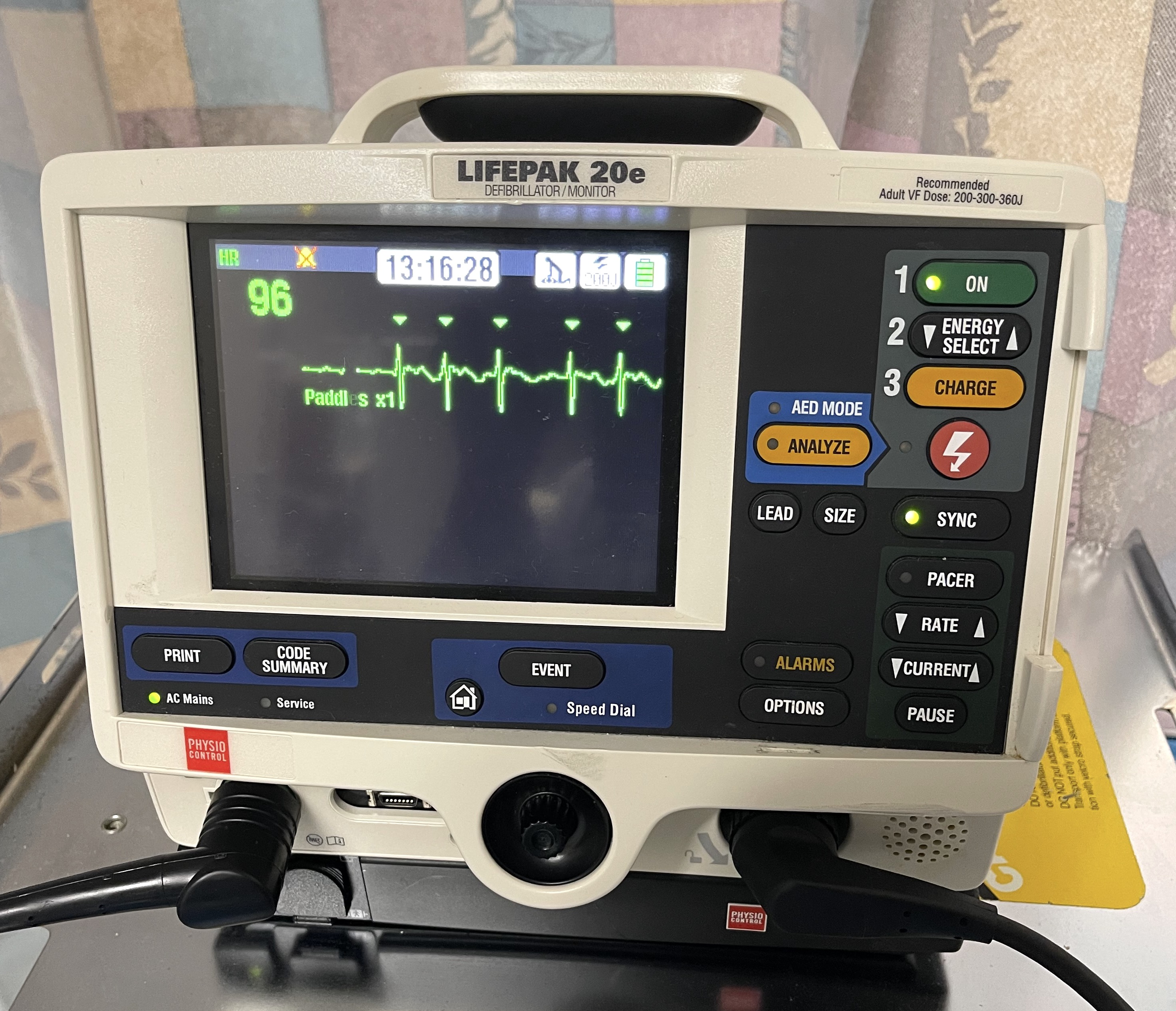
LIFEPAK 20e Defibrillator and Monitor displaying synchronization with QRS complexes. (arrowheads)

Often a transesophageal echocardiogram (TEE) is used to assess for thrombus in the left atrial appendage (LAA). This imaging procedure involves inserting an ultrasound probe into the esophagus to obtain detailed images of heart structures, particularly the LAA, where clots commonly form during arrythmia. Detecting the absence of thrombus via TEE allows for safer immediate cardioversion without the need for prolonged anticoagulation beforehand.

=== Cardioversion ===
Once the machine is synced with the patient's cardiac rhythm, the machine must be charged. To determine the amount of energy (measured in joules "J") the patient requires, many factors are considered. As a rule of thumb, recent-onset atrial arrhythmias require less energy compared to persistent atrial arrhythmias. If the cardiologist suspects that the patient may be less respondent to cardioversion, a higher energy may be utilized. Once the machine is synced and charged, a shock can be delivered to the patient.

==== Recommended energy levels ====
- Atrial flutter and SVT: 50-100 J for biphasic devices; 100 J for monophasic devices
- Atrial fibrillation: 120-200 J for biphasic devices; 200 J for monophasic devices
- Ventricular tachycardia (with a pulse): 100 J for biphasic devices; 200 J for monophasic devices
- Pulseless ventricular tachycardia and ventricular fibrillation: 120-200 J for biphasic devices; 360 J for monophasic devices

=== After cardioversion ===
Following electrical cardioversion, the cardiologist will determine if sinus rhythm has been restored. To confirm sinus rhythm, a distinct P wave should be seen preceding each QRS complex. Additionally, each R-R interval should be evenly spaced. If sinus rhythm is restored, the pads may be disconnected, and any other medical equipment is removed from the patients (e.g., bite blocks, restraints, etc.). The patient will regain consciousness soon thereafter (the effects of Propofol generally last for only 3–8 minutes). However, if the arrhythmia is persistent, the machine may be re-charged to a higher energy level, and the cardioversion attempt may be repeated. It is recommended to wait 60 seconds between subsequent cardioversion attempts, but this amount of time may be adjusted based on the patient and/or provider.

== Electrode pad placement ==
Pad placement for electrical cardioversion a cardiac arrhythmia may be either anterior-posterior or anterior-lateral. In an anterior-posterior setup one pad is placed on the chest and the other pad is placed on the back. In an anterior-lateral setup, one pad is placed on the chest and the other pad is placed along the left midaxillary line. Choosing the right pad placement can be an important aspect when measuring the success of electrical cardioversion. For example, the anterior-posterior pad positioning is commonly used when attempting to restore an atrial arrhythmia as the vector between the pads predominately runs through the atria. The anterior-lateral pad positioning may be used when attempting to restore pulseless ventricular tachycardia or ventricular fibrillation as there may not be enough time or strength to apply an electrode the patient's back.

=== Anterior-posterior pad placement ===
The anterior pad should be placed inferior to the right clavicle while also being vertically centered over at the level of the right 4th intercostal space. The posterior pad should be placed just lateral to the left side of the spine and vertically centered at the level of T7. The inferior angle of the scapula can be used as a reference for the level of T7.

=== Anterior-lateral pad placement ===
The anterior pad should be placed inferior to the right clavicle while also being vertically centered over at the level of the right 4th intercostal space. The lateral pad should be placed along the left midaxillary line at the level of the left 5th intercostal space. The left nipple can be used as a reference for the level of the left 4th intercostal space. From here, the midaxillary 5th intercostal space is identified by moving inferiorly one intercostal space and laterally towards the midaxillary line.

== See also ==
- Implantable cardioverter-defibrillator (ICD)
- Transcutaneous pacing
- Automated external defibrillator
- Cardiopulmonary resuscitation (CPR)
