= RMN =

RMN may refer to:

- R.M.N., a 2022 film set in Romania
- Radio Mindanao Network
- Reconciling Ministries Network, a Christian organisation
- Registered Mental Nurse, a nursing credential in the UK
- Réunion des Musées Nationaux, a French cultural umbrella organisation
- Richard Milhous Nixon (1913–1994), 37th president of the United States
- Robotic Magnetic Navigation
- Royal Malaysian Navy
- IATA code for Stafford Regional Airport
- Republica Moldovenească Nistreană, the Romanian-language name of the Pridnestrovian Moldavian Republic
