= Paroxysmal tachycardia =

Episodes of abnormally fast heart rate

- Other names: Bouveret-Hoffmann syndrome
- Specialty: Cardiology

Paroxysmal tachycardia is a form of tachycardia which begins and ends in an acute (or paroxysmal) manner.

It is also known as Bouveret-Hoffmann syndrome.

== Cause ==
The cause of this condition is not accurately known, though it is probably of nervous origin and can be aggravated by physical wear and tear. The symptoms are sometimes very alarming but it is not considered in itself dangerous.

It has an increased risk of developing in WPW syndrome and LGL syndrome.

== Diagnosis ==
=== Classification ===
It can be divided by the origin:

- supraventricular tachycardia
- ventricular tachycardia
