= Proarrhythmia =

Type of drug side effect

Proarrhythmia is a new or more frequent occurrence of pre-existing arrhythmias, paradoxically precipitated by antiarrhythmic therapy, which means it is a side effect associated with the administration of some existing antiarrhythmic drugs, as well as drugs for other indications. In other words, it is a tendency of antiarrhythmic drugs to facilitate emergence of new arrhythmias.

== Types of proarrhythmia ==
According to the Vaughan Williams classification (VW) of antiarrhythmic drugs, there are 3 main types of Proarrhythmia during treatment with various antiarrhythmic drugs for Atrial Fibrillation or Atrial flutter:

=== Ventricular proarrhythmia ===
- Torsades de pointes (VW type IA and type III drugs)
- Sustained monomorphic ventricular tachycardia (usually VW type IC drugs)
- Sustained polymorphic ventricular tachycardia/ventricular fibrillation without long QT (VW types IA, IC, and III drugs)

=== Atrial proarrhythmia ===
- Conversion of atrial fibrillation to flutter (usually VW type IC drugs or amiodarone). May be a desired effect.
- Increase of defibrillation threshold (a potential problem with VW type IC drugs)
- Provocation of recurrence (probably VW types IA, IC and III drugs). It is rare.

=== Abnormalities of conduction or impulse formation ===
- Sinus node dysfunction, atrioventricular block (almost all drugs)
- Accelerate conduction over accessory pathway (digoxin, intravenous verapamil, or diltiazem)
- Acceleration of ventricular rate during atrial fibrillation (VW type IA and type IC drugs).

== Increased risk ==
- Presence of structural heart disease, especially LV systolic dysfunction.
- Class IC agents.
- Increased age.
- Females.

== Clinical pointers ==
=== Class IA drugs ===
- Dose independent, occurring at normal levels.
- Follow QT interval, keep ms.

=== Class IC drugs ===
- May be provoked by increased heart rate.
- Exercise stress tests after loading.

=== Class III drugs ===
- Dose dependent.
- Follow bradycardia, prolonged QT closely.
