= Defibrillation threshold =

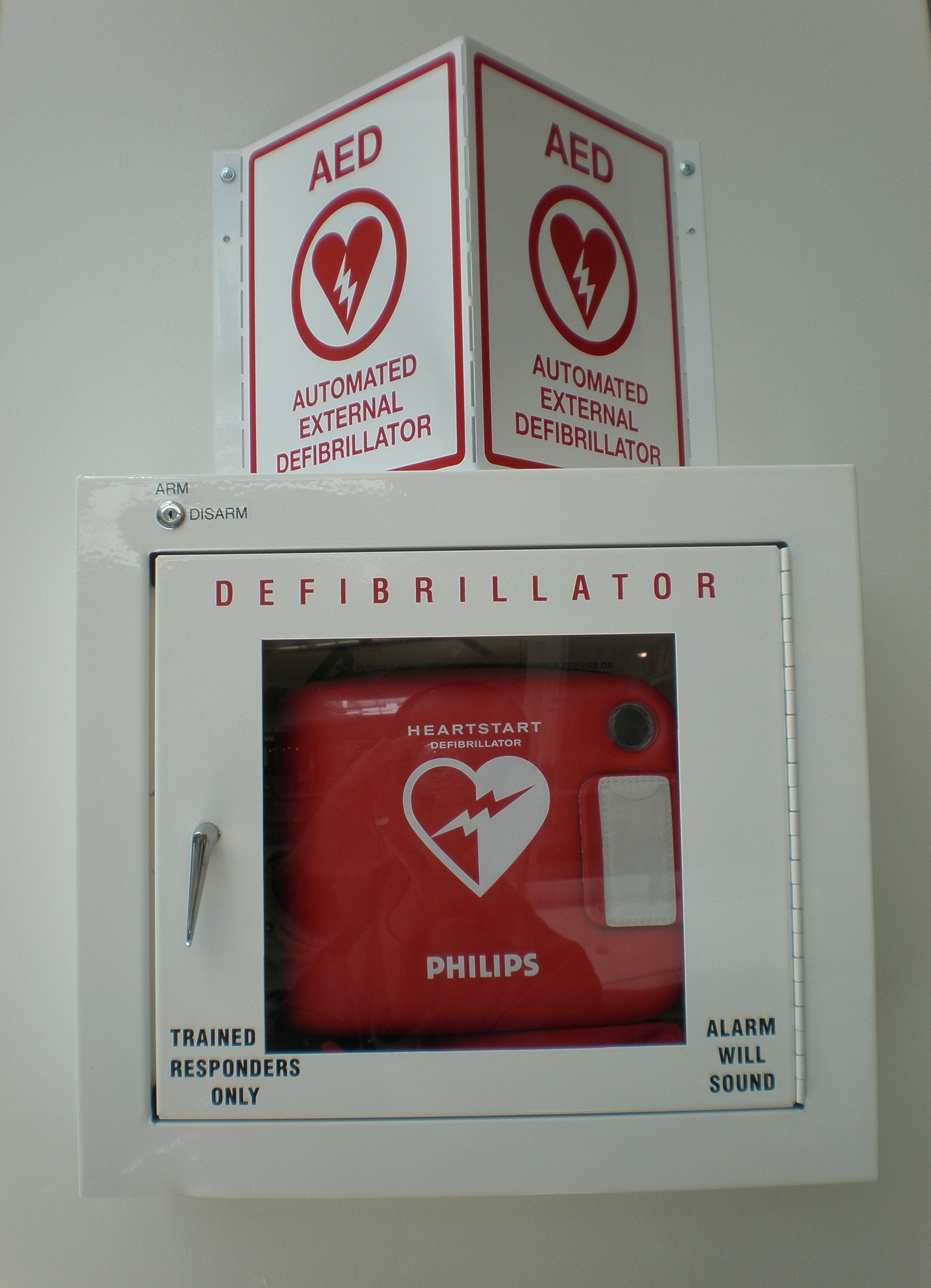
Philips Automated External Defibrillator

Defibrillation threshold (DFT) indicates the minimum amount of energy needed to return normal rhythm to a heart that is beating in a cardiac dysrhythmia.

The concept is both applicable to automated external defibrillators (AEDs) and implantable cardiac defibrillators (ICDs). Typical examples are the minimum amount of energy, expressed in joules, delivered by external defibrillator paddles or pads, required to break atrial fibrillation and restore normal sinus rhythm. Other common scenarios are restoring normal rhythm from atrial flutter, ventricular tachycardia or ventricular fibrillation.

Modern AEDs usually operate in 150 to 200 J for biphasic devices and up to 360 J for monophasic devices. On the other hand, the maximum output for transvenous ICDs is between 35 and 40 J and up to 80 J for modern subcutaneous ICDs. The test needed to establish the defibrillation threshold is often referred to as DFT.

== Mechanism ==
The right DFT sends a short and high energy shock that depolarizes a substantial part of the myocardium. The shock stops disorganized electrical activity that causes fibrillation, which lets the heart's normal conduction system take back control and start coordinated contractions again. The upper limit of ventricular vulnerability is the greatest shock strength that can cause ventricular fibrillation during cardiac repolarization. To be effective, defibrillation shock strength must be equal or greater than this level. Weak shocks may fail to stop fibrillation or temporarily stop electric activity, but fibrillation may eventually return.

In clinical studies, unsuccessful defibrillation during standard testing with ICDs occurs in 4% of patients and corrective strategies include repositioning the defibrillation leads, modifying the shock vector or polarity, revising the generator pocket, or adding additional defibrillation electrodes such as a subcutaneous array.

== Automated external defibrillators ==
In clinical practice, the real threshold can be approximated but not exactly established, since the defibrillating shock can be delivered only once. Aside from that, energy isn't directly related to stimulus strength and efficiency, which is primarily determined by the delivered charge over time in mC and not power over time or energy, which are still used due to historical reasons. Charge based thresholds are more realistic parameters for shock efficacy. Usual values delivered by biphasic defibrillators lay between 50 and 300 mC.

The amount of charge needed is influenced by certain medications, in particular sotalol, tend to lower such threshold, while others, such as Amiodarone, may increase it.

Most modern biphasic AEDs operate in the range of 150 to 200 J and that threshold can be increased up to 360 J for monophasic defibrillators. The defibrillation threshold ranking in these settings, from lowest to highest, would be, in order, ventricular tachycardia, atrial flutter, atrial fibrillation, ventricular fibrillation.

== Implantable cardiac defibrillators ==
The main goal of an Implantable cardiac defibrillator is to reach the appropriate defibrillation threshold needed to successfully stop an abnormal heart rhythm like ventricular fibrillation. They were developed in the 1980s with the aim to prevent sudden cardiac death. Over time, they were found to be efficacious at stopping cardiac arrythmias and became an effective way to prevent them. DFT of at least 10 J below the device maximum shock output is considered acceptable with modern devices being able to deliver shocks as high as 35 J.

A greater defibrillation threshold is usually required for patients with dilated cardiomyopathy, a lower left ventricular ejection fraction, a cardiac resynchronization therapy device, and/or on Amiodarone. Intraoperative testing was once thought to be the gold standard for verifying ICD function, but because the procedure necessitates inducing ventricular fibrillation and carries a slight risk of complications like hemodynamic instability, stroke, or death, its routine use has become more contentious in recent years. Because of this, several facilities now save defibrillation testing for patients who are more likely to require a greater defibrillation threshold.
