= Atrial tachycardia =

Abnormal heart rhythm originating from an atrial location

Atrial Tachycardia
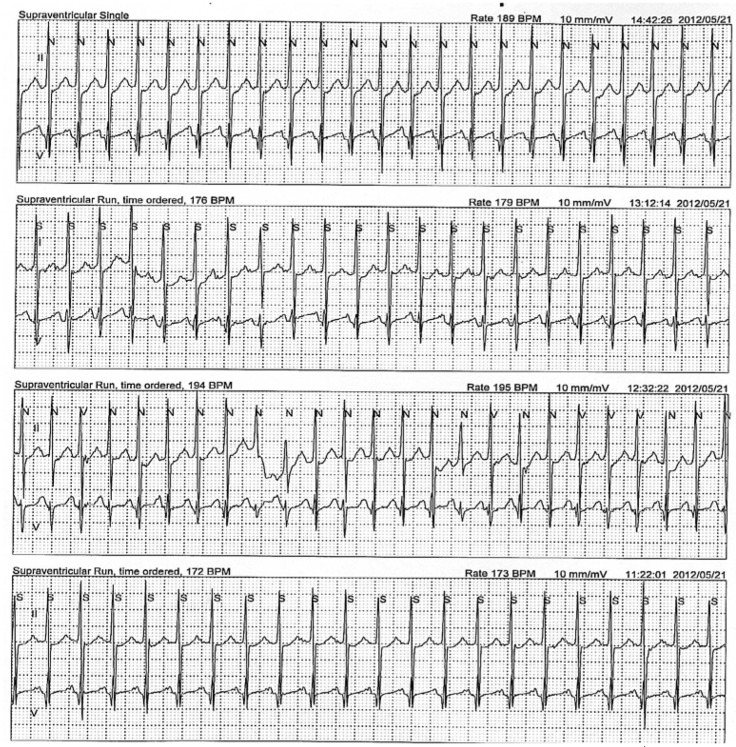
- Specialty: Cardiology, electrophysiology
- Symptoms: Palpitations, pre-syncope, sweating, anxiety, shortness of breath, chest pain
- Types: Paroxysmal atrial tachycardia (PAT), focal atrial tachycardia (FAT), ectopic atrial tachycardia (EAT), unifocal atrial tachycardia (UAT), multifocal atrial tachycardia (MAT), macroreentrant atrial tachycardia (MRAT)

Atrial tachycardia is an umbrella term for an abnormal heart rhythm, specifically a subtype of Supraventricular tachycardia, in which the heart's electrical impulse begins in the upper chambers (atria), rather than from the sinoatrial node, which is the normal origin of the heart's electrical activity. As with any other form of tachycardia, the underlying mechanism can be from various triggers such as the rapid discharge of an abnormal focus, the presence of a ring of cardiac tissue that gives rise to a circle movement (reentry), or a triggered rapid rhythm due to other pathological circumstances, i.e. digoxin toxicity or Adverse drug reaction.

== Signs and symptoms ==
Signs and symptoms of atrial tachycardia is usually accompanied by symptoms related to a rapid heart rate. Episodes may be sudden in onset and resolve without treatment. Irregular and rapid heart rates may produce symptoms such as Palpitations, Lightheadedness, Chest pain, Shortness of breath, and pre-Syncope

A normal resting heart rate is 60-100 beats per minute. A resting heart rate of more than 100 beats per minute is characterized as tachycardia. During an atrial tachycardia episode, the heart beats from 100 to >300 beats per minute.

== Classification ==
Forms of atrial tachycardia (ATach) include multifocal atrial tachycardia (MAT), focal atrial tachycardia and atrial flutter. Paroxysmal atrial tachycardia (PAT) is an episode of arrhythmia that begins and ends abruptly.

== Etiology ==
Atrial tachycardia tends to occur in individuals with structural heart disease, with or without heart failure, and ischemic coronary artery disease. However, focal atrial tachycardia often occurs in healthy individuals without structural heart disease. Other possible etiologies are listed below:

- Hypoxia
- Pulmonary disease
- Ischemic heart disease
- Stimulants: cocaine, caffeine, chocolate, ephedra
- Alcohol
- Metabolic disturbances
- Digoxin toxicity
- Heightened sympathetic tone

A study noted 10 to 15% of patients presenting for supraventricular tachycardia (SVT) ablation had atrial tachycardia.

== Diagnosis ==
Electrocardiographic features include:

- Atrial rate: 100 to 250 BPM
- Ventricular conduction can be variable
  - Irregular or irregularly irregular in the setting of variable AV block
  - Regular if 1 to 1, 2 to 1, or 4 to 1 AV block
- P wave morphology
  - Unifocal, but similar in morphology to each other
  - Might be inverted
  - Differs from normal sinus P wave
- May exhibit either long RP or short PR intervals
- Rhythm may be paroxysmal or sustained
  - May demonstrate an increase in the rate at initiation (e.g., "warm up," or "rev up")
  - May demonstrate a decrease in the rate at termination (e.g., "cool down")

== Treatment ==
Initial management of focal atrial tachycardia should focus on addressing underlying causes: treating acute illness, cessation of stimulants, stress reduction, appropriately managing digoxin toxicity, or chronic disease management. The ventricular rate is controllable with the use of beta blockers or calcium channel blockers. If atrial tachyarrhythmia persists and the patient is symptomatic, the patient may benefit from class IA, IC, or class III antiarrhythmics. Catheter ablation of focal atrial tachycardia may be appropriate in patients failing medical therapy.

== Epidemiology ==
A European study of young males applying for pilot licenses demonstrated that 0.34% had asymptomatic atrial tachycardia and 0.46% had symptomatic atrial tachycardia.
