= Encainide =

Chemical compound

Clinical data
- Trade names: Enkaid
- AHFS/Drugs.com: Micromedex Detailed Consumer Information
- MedlinePlus: a605040
- ATC code: C01BC08 (WHO)

Legal status
- Legal status: Withdrawn

Identifiers
- IUPAC name: 4-Methoxy-N-[2-(1-methyl-2-piperidin-1-ylethyl)phenyl]benzamide
- CAS Number: 66778-36-7
- PubChem CID: 48041
- DrugBank: DB01228
- ChemSpider: 43697
- UNII: SY3J0147NB
- KEGG: D07894
- ChEBI: CHEBI:4788
- ChEMBL: ChEMBL315838
- CompTox Dashboard (EPA): DTXSID0022983

Chemical and physical data
- Formula: C_{22}H_{28}N_{2}O_{2}
- Molar mass: 352.478 g·mol^{−1}
- 3D model (JSmol): Interactive image
- SMILES: COc1ccc(C(=O)Nc2ccccc2CCC2CCCCN2C)cc1
- InChI: InChI=1S/C22H28N2O2/c1-24-16-6-5-8-19(24)13-10-17-7-3-4-9-21(17)23-22(25)18-11-14-20(26-2)15-12-18/h3-4,7,9,11-12,14-15,19H,5-6,8,10,13,16H2,1-2H3,(H,23,25); Key:PJWPNDMDCLXCOM-UHFFFAOYSA-N

Encainide (trade name Enkaid) is a class Ic antiarrhythmic agent. It is no longer used because of its frequent proarrhythmic side effects.

== Synthesis ==
Synthesis:<

== See also ==
- Iferanserin
- Cardiac Arrhythmia Suppression Trial
