= Structural heart disease =

Group of related heart diseases

Structural heart disease, also known as structural cardiac disease, is a collection of heart diseases that includes heart failure, coronary artery disease, hypertrophic cardiomyopathy, and congenital heart disease.
