= Cardiac Arrhythmia Suppression Trial =

Pharmaceutical study

The Cardiac Arrhythmia Suppression Trial (CAST) was a double-blind, randomized, controlled study designed to test the hypothesis that suppression of premature ventricular complexes (PVC) with class I antiarrhythmic agents after a myocardial infarction (MI) would reduce mortality. It was conducted between 1986 and 1989 and included over 1700 patients in 27 centres. The study found that the tested drugs increased mortality instead of lowering it as was expected. The publication of these results in 1991/92, in combination with large follow-up studies for drugs that had not been tested in CAST, led to a paradigm shift in the treatment of MI patients. Class I and III antiarrhythmics are now only used with extreme caution after MI, or they are contraindicated completely.

== Study design ==
The second Cardiac Arrhythmia Suppression Trial (CAST II) modified the enrollment criteria to include patients at higher risk for serious arrhythmia. This included 1) patients enrolled within 4 to 90 days of a previous MI, 2) a left ventricular ejection fraction lower than 40%, 3) prior to enrollment, suppression of PVCs had occurred with the drugs (vs. placebo) using a double-blinded design, and 4) patients having more serious arrhythmias would also be included.

== Results ==
The drugs used (encainide, flecainide, and moracizine) successfully reduced the amount of PVCs, but led to more arrhythmia-related deaths. Total mortality was significantly higher with both encainide and flecainide at a mean follow-up period of 10 months. Within about two years after enrollment, encainide and flecainide were discontinued because of increased mortality and sudden cardiac death. CAST II compared moracizine to placebo, but was also stopped because of early (within two weeks) cardiac death in the moracizine group, and long-term benefit seemed highly unlikely. The excess mortality was attributed to proarrhythmic effects of the agents. Class I antiarrhythmics are proarrhythmic during heart ischemia in animals.
