= Ashman phenomenon =

- Other names: Ashman beats
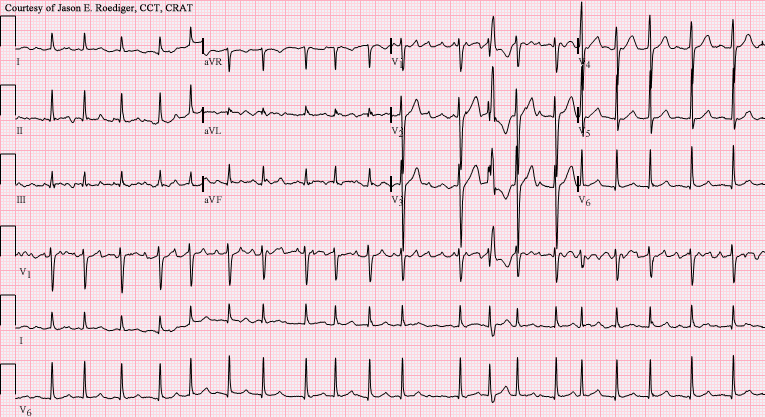
- Atrial fibrillation with rapid ventricular response; Ashman's phenomenon with RBBB aberrancy (13th beat)
- Named after: Richard Ashman

Ashman phenomenon, also known as Ashman beats, describes a particular type of wide, supraventricular QRS complex. Ashman is seen in many types of supraventricular arrhythmias (notably atrial fibrillation), and even in sinus rhythms with frequent premature atrial contractions. It is a type of cardiac aberrancy and it is more often misinterpreted as a premature ventricular complex.

It is named for Richard Ashman (of New Orleans) (1890 –1969), after first being described by Gouaux and Ashman in 1947.

== Presentation ==
Ashman beats are described as wide complex QRS complexes that follow a short R-R interval preceded by a long R-R interval. This short QRS complex typically has a right bundle branch block morphology and represents an aberrantly conducted complex that originates above the AV node, rather than a complex that originates in either the right or left ventricle.

== Cause ==
It occurs because the duration of the refractory period of the myocardium is proportional to the R-R interval of the preceding cycle. A short R-R interval is associated with a shorter duration of action potential and vice versa. A long R-R cycle will prolong the ensuing refractory period, and if a shorter cycle follows, the beat terminating the cycle is likely to be conducted aberrantly. Because the refractory period of the right bundle branch is longer than the left, the right bundle will still be in the refractory period when the supraventricular impulse reaches the His-Purkinje system, resulting in a complex with right bundle branch block morphology.

== Prognosis ==
Clinically, it is often asymptomatic by itself and considered benign in nature.

== See also ==
- Atrial fibrillation
- Electrocardiogram
