= Ventricular tachycardia =

Abnormally fast rhythm of the heart's ventricles

- Other names: V-tach, Vtach, VT
- A run of ventricular tachycardia as seen on a rhythm strip
- Specialty: Cardiology
- Symptoms: Lightheadedness, palpitations, chest pain, shortness of breath, Decreased level or total loss of consciousness
- Complications: Cardiac arrest, ventricular fibrillation
- Types: Non-sustained (NSVT), sustained
- Causes: Coronary heart disease, aortic stenosis, cardiomyopathy, electrolyte problems, heart attack
- Diagnostic method: Electrocardiogram
- Differential diagnosis: Supraventricular tachycardia with aberrancy, ventricular pacing, ECG artifact
- Prevention: Implantable cardiac defibrillator, calcium channel blockers, amiodarone
- Treatment: Procainamide, cardioversion, cardiopulmonary resuscitation
- Frequency: ~7% of people in cardiac arrest

Ventricular tachycardia (V-tach or VT) is a cardiovascular disorder in which fast heart rate occurs in the ventricles of the heart. Although a few seconds of VT may not result in permanent problems, longer periods are dangerous; and multiple episodes over a short period of time are referred to as an electrical storm, which also occurs when one has a seizure (although this is referred to as an electrical storm in the brain). Short periods may occur without symptoms, or present with lightheadedness, palpitations, shortness of breath, chest pain, and decreased level of consciousness. Ventricular tachycardia may lead to coma and persistent vegetative state due to lack of blood and oxygen to the brain. Ventricular tachycardia may result in ventricular fibrillation (VF) and turn into cardiac arrest. This conversion of the VT into VF is called the degeneration of the VT. It is found initially in about 7% of people in cardiac arrest.

Ventricular tachycardia can occur due to coronary heart disease, aortic stenosis, cardiomyopathy, electrolyte imbalance, or a heart attack. Diagnosis is by an electrocardiogram (ECG) showing a rate of greater than 120 beats per minute and at least three wide QRS complexes in a row. It is classified as non-sustained versus sustained based on whether it lasts less than or more than 30 seconds. The term ventricular arrhythmia refers to the group of abnormal cardiac rhythms originating from the ventricle, which includes ventricular tachycardia, ventricular fibrillation, and torsades de pointes.

In those who have normal blood pressure and strong pulse, the antiarrhythmic medication procainamide may be used. Otherwise, immediate cardioversion is recommended, preferably with a biphasic DC shock of 200 joules. In those in cardiac arrest due to ventricular tachycardia, cardiopulmonary resuscitation (CPR) and defibrillation is recommended. Biphasic defibrillation may be better than monophasic. While waiting for a defibrillator, a precordial thump may be attempted (by those who have experience) in those on a heart monitor who are seen going into an unstable ventricular tachycardia. In those with cardiac arrest due to ventricular tachycardia, survival is about 75%. An implantable cardiac defibrillator and medications such as beta-blockers or amiodarone may be used to prevent recurrence. Non-dihydropyridine calcium channel blockers such as verapamil have a limited role and may be of benefit in idiopathic interfascicular reentrant LVT, but should be avoided in the vast majority of cases per AHA guidelines, especially in patients with structural abnormalities such as heart failure with reduced ejection fraction or necrotic damage due to prolonged acute coronary syndrome, in which beta-blockers remain first-line whereas non-dihydropyridines may precipitate the onset of hemodynamic collapse.

== Signs and symptoms ==
While a few seconds may not result in problems, longer periods are dangerous. Short periods may occur without symptoms or present with lightheadedness, palpitations, shortness of breath, chest pain, or unconsciousness. Ventricular tachycardia may turn into ventricular fibrillation and can result in cardiac arrest.

== Cause ==
Ventricular tachycardia can occur due to coronary heart disease, aortic stenosis, cardiomyopathy, electrolyte problems (e.g., low blood levels of magnesium or potassium), inherited channelopathies (e.g., long-QT syndrome), catecholaminergic polymorphic ventricular tachycardia, arrhythmogenic right ventricular dysplasia, alcohol withdrawal syndrome (typically following atrial fibrillation), or a myocardial infarction.

== Pathophysiology ==
The morphology of the tachycardia depends on its cause and the origin of the re-entry electrical circuit in the heart.

In monomorphic ventricular tachycardia, the shape of each heart beat on the ECG looks the same because the impulse is either being generated from increased automaticity of a single point in either the left or the right ventricle, or due to a reentry circuit within the ventricle. The most common cause of monomorphic ventricular tachycardia is scarring of the heart muscle from a previous myocardial infarction (heart attack). This scar cannot conduct electrical activity, so there is a potential circuit around the scar that results in the tachycardia. This is similar to the re-entrant circuits that are the cause of atrial flutter and the re-entrant forms of supraventricular tachycardia. Other rarer congenital causes of monomorphic VT include right ventricular dysplasia, and right and left ventricular outflow tract VT.

Polymorphic ventricular tachycardia, on the other hand, is most commonly caused by abnormalities of ventricular muscle repolarization. The predisposition to this problem usually manifests on the ECG as a prolongation of the QT interval. QT prolongation may be congenital or acquired. Congenital problems include long QT syndrome and catecholaminergic polymorphic ventricular tachycardia. Acquired problems are usually related to drug toxicity or electrolyte abnormalities, but can occur as a result of myocardial ischemia. Class III anti-arrhythmic drugs such as sotalol and amiodarone prolong the QT interval and may in some circumstances be pro-arrhythmic. Other relatively common drugs including some antibiotics and antihistamines may also be a danger, in particular in combination with one another. Problems with blood levels of potassium, magnesium and calcium may also contribute. High-dose magnesium is often used as an antidote in cardiac arrest protocols.

== Diagnosis ==
The diagnosis of ventricular tachycardia is made based on the rhythm seen on either a 12-lead ECG or a telemetry rhythm strip. It may be very difficult to differentiate between ventricular tachycardia and wide-complex supraventricular tachycardia in some cases. In particular, supraventricular tachycardias with aberrant conduction from a pre-existing bundle branch block are commonly misdiagnosed as ventricular tachycardia. Other rarer phenomena include Ashman beats and antidromic atrioventricular re-entry tachycardias.

Various diagnostic criteria, such as the Brugada criteria, have been developed to determine whether a wide complex tachycardia is ventricular tachycardia or a more benign rhythm. In addition to these diagnostic criteria, if the individual has a history of a myocardial infarction, congestive heart failure, or recent angina, the wide complex tachycardia is much more likely to be ventricular tachycardia. However, no set of criteria provides complete diagnostic accuracy in the evaluation of wide complex tachycardia.

The proper diagnosis is important, as the misdiagnosis of supraventricular tachycardia when ventricular tachycardia is present is associated with worse prognosis. This is particularly true if calcium channel blockers, such as verapamil, are used to attempt to terminate a presumed supraventricular tachycardia. Therefore, it is wisest to assume that all wide complex tachycardia is VT until proven otherwise.

ECG features of ventricular tachycardia, in addition to the increased heart rate, are:

1. A wide QRS complex (because the ectopics for the generation of the cardiac impulse originate in the ventricular myocyte and are propagated via the intermyocyte conduction, which is a delayed conduction)
2. A Josephson's sign where there is the notch in the downsloping of the S wave near its nadir (considered very specific for the VT)
3. Capture beats (normal QRS complex in between when the heart picks up the sinus rhythm from the impulses generated by the SA node), fusion beats (due to the fusion of the abnormal and the normal QRS complexes), which has a unique morphology
4. Positive or negative concordance
5. Extreme axis deviation or northwest axis (axis between -90 and +180 degrees)

=== Classification ===
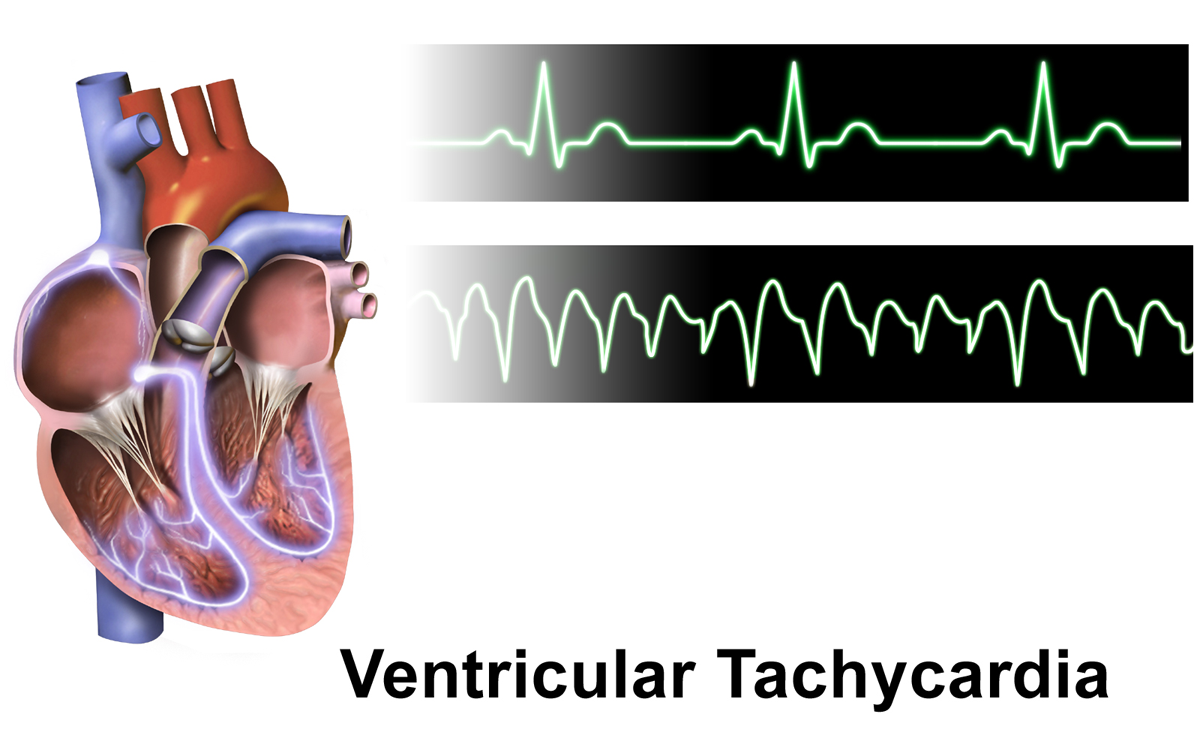
Normal sinus top, ventricular tachycardia bottom

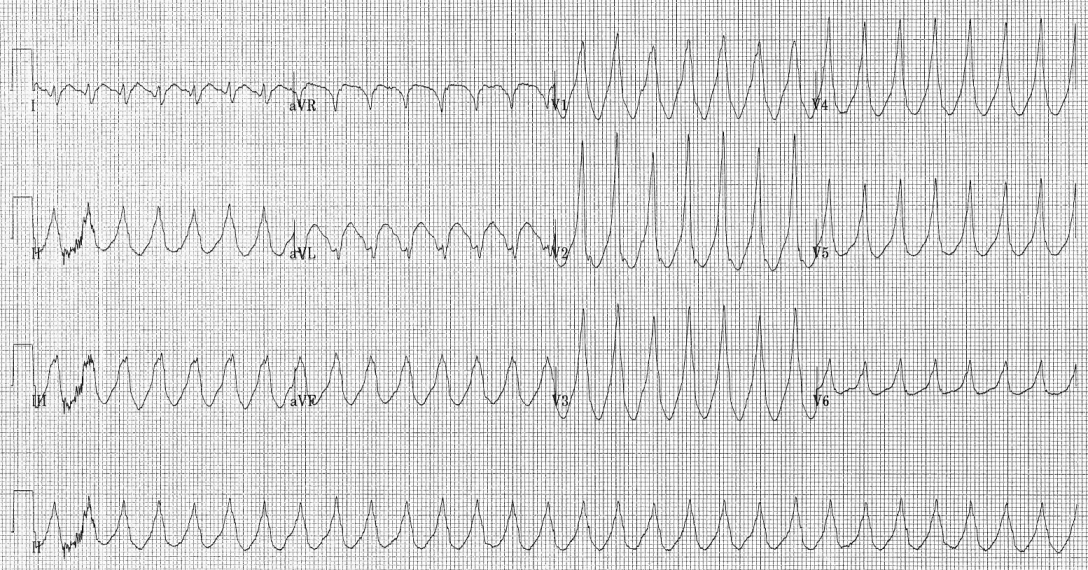
12 lead electrocardiogram showing a run of monomorphic ventricular tachycardia (VT)

Ventricular tachycardia can be classified based on its morphology:

- Monomorphic ventricular tachycardia means that the appearance of all the beats match each other in each lead of a surface electrocardiogram (ECG).
  - Scar-related monomorphic ventricular tachycardia is the most common type and a frequent cause of death in patients having survived a heart attack, especially if they have weak heart muscle.
  - Right ventricular outflow tract (RVOT) tachycardia is a type of monomorphic ventricular tachycardia originating in the right ventricular outflow tract. RVOT morphology refers to the characteristic pattern of this type of tachycardia on an ECG.
  - The source of the re-entry circuit can be identified by evaluating the morphology of the QRS complex in the V1 lead of a surface ECG. If the R wave is dominant (consistent with a right bundle branch block morphology), this indicates the origin of the VT is the left ventricle. Conversely, if the S wave is dominant (consistent with a left bundle branch block morphology, this is consistent with VT originating from the right ventricle or interventricular septum.
- Polymorphic ventricular tachycardia, on the other hand, has beat-to-beat variations in morphology. This may appear as a cyclical progressive change in cardiac axis, previously referred to by its French name torsades de pointes ("twisting of the spikes"). However, at the current time, the term torsades de pointes is reserved for polymorphic VT occurring in the context of a prolonged resting QT interval.

Another way to classify ventricular tachycardias is the duration of the episodes: Three or more beats in a row on an ECG that originate from the ventricle at a rate of more than 120 beats per minute constitute a ventricular tachycardia.

- If the fast rhythm self-terminates within 30 seconds, it is considered a non-sustained ventricular tachycardia.
- If the rhythm lasts more than 30 seconds, it is known as a sustained ventricular tachycardia (even if it terminates on its own after 30 seconds).

A third way to classify ventricular tachycardia is on the basis of its symptoms: Pulseless VT is associated with no effective cardiac output, hence, no effective pulse, and is a cause of cardiac arrest (see also: pulseless electrical activity [PEA]). In this circumstance, it is best treated the same way as ventricular fibrillation (VF), and is recognized as one of the shockable rhythms on the cardiac arrest protocol. Some VT is associated with reasonable cardiac output and may even be asymptomatic. The heart usually tolerates this rhythm poorly in the medium to long term, and patients may certainly deteriorate to pulseless VT or to VF.

Occasionally in ventricular tachycardia, supraventricular impulses are conducted to the ventricles, generating QRS complexes with normal or aberrant supraventricular morphology (ventricular capture). Or, those impulses can be merged with complexes that are originated in the ventricle and produce a summation pattern (fusion complexes).

Less common is ventricular tachycardia that occurs in individuals with structurally normal hearts. This is known as idiopathic ventricular tachycardia and in the monomorphic form coincides with little or no increased risk of sudden cardiac death. In general, idiopathic ventricular tachycardia occurs in younger individuals diagnosed with VT. While the causes of idiopathic VT are not known, in general it is presumed to be congenital, and can be brought on by any number of diverse factors.

== Treatment ==
Therapy may be directed either at terminating an episode of the abnormal heart rhythm or at reducing the risk of another VT episode. The treatment for stable VT is tailored to the specific person, with regard to how well the individual tolerates episodes of ventricular tachycardia, how frequently episodes occur, their comorbidities, and their wishes. Individuals with pulseless VT or unstable VT are hemodynamically compromised and require immediate electric cardioversion to shock them out of the VT rhythm.

=== Cardioversion ===
If the patient has a pulse, meaning blood is circulating around their body and reaching vital organs, it is usually possible to terminate the episode using electric cardioversion. Cardioversion should be synchronized to the R wave in order to avoid degeneration of the rhythm to ventricular fibrillation, if possible. An initial energy of 100J is recommended. If the waveform is polymorphic, then higher energies and an unsynchronized shock should be provided (also known as defibrillation).

=== Defibrillation ===
A person with pulseless VT should be treated following current ACLS guidelines. This includes high-energy unsynchronized defibrillation, at either 360J for a monophasic defibrillator or 200J for a biphasic defibrillator. Additionally, epinephrine and other antiarrythmatics such as lidocane may be administered to terminate the rhythm.

The shock may be delivered to the outside of the chest using the two pads of an external defibrillator, or internally to the heart by an implantable cardioverter-defibrillator (ICD) if one has previously been inserted.

An ICD may also be set to attempt to overdrive pace the ventricle. Pacing the ventricle at a rate faster than the underlying tachycardia can sometimes be effective in terminating the rhythm. If this fails after a short trial, the ICD will usually stop pacing, charge up and deliver a defibrillation grade shock.

=== Medication ===
For those who are stable with a monomorphic waveform the medications procainamide or sotalol may be used and are more effective than lidocaine. Evidence does not show that amiodarone is better than procainamide.

Magnesium sulfate can be administered to help terminate Torsades de Pointes. This works irrespective of whether there is an underlying magnesium deficiency causing the arrythmia.

Long-term anti-arrhythmic therapy may be indicated to prevent recurrence of VT. Beta-blockers and a number of class III anti-arrhythmics are commonly used, such as the beta-blockers carvedilol, metoprolol, and bisoprolol, and the Potassium-Channel-Blockers amiodarone, dronedarone, bretylium, sotalol, ibutilide, and dofetilide. Angiotensin-converting-enzyme (ACE) inhibitors and aldosterone antagonists are also sometimes used in this setting.

=== Invasive treatment ===
An ICD (implantable cardioverter defibrillator) is more effective than drug therapy for prevention of sudden cardiac death due to VT and VF, but does not prevent these rhythms from happening.

Catheter ablation is a potentially definitive treatment option for those with recurrent VT. Remote magnetic navigation is one effective method to do the procedure.

In the past, ablation was often not considered until pharmacological options had been exhausted, often after the patient had developed substantial morbidity from recurrent episodes of VT and ICD shocks. Antiarrhythmic medications can reduce the frequency of ICD therapies, but have efficacy variations, and side effects can be significant. Advances in technology and understanding of VT substrates now allow ablation of multiple and unstable VTs with acceptable safety and efficacy, even in patients with advanced heart disease.
