= Cheng (surname) =

- 程 and 成, the two most common Chinese surnames with pinyin romanisation "Cheng"

Origin
- Region of origin: China

Other names
- Variant forms: Zheng, Ching

Cheng can be a transcription of one of several Chinese surnames. Since the syllable Cheng represents different sounds in Hanyu pinyin and the Wade–Giles systems of Chinese romanization, some ambiguity will exist as to which sound is represented by the letters "Cheng" if the romanisation and tone is not known. Also within each system of romanisation, each syllable can represent one of several different characters, as with any Chinese syllable.

In the pinyin system of romanization (usually used in China), the most common surnames romanized as Cheng are 程 and 成. In 2019 程 was the 44th most common surname in mainland China.

In names romanized in Wade–Giles (usually used in Taiwan), Cheng is most commonly a transcription of 鄭/郑 (pinyin Zhèng). Cheng can also be the Cantonese version of Zheng (鄭) and Jing (井), non-standard romanization of Cen (岑), and Teochew or Hokkien pronunciation of Zhong (鍾) and Zhuang (莊).

Further confusion arises because Wade–Giles often appears without the required apostrophes (which indicates aspiration), and thus some Wade–Giles names which are properly romanized Ch'eng (such as 程 pinyin Chéng) will appear as Cheng.

== Origins ==
There are a number of accounts of the origin of the same 成 (Chéng) surname. It was the name of fiefdom Cheng (郕) in Henan belong to Shu Wu, a son of King Wen of Zhou. His descendants adopted the name Cheng, simplifying it to 成 by dropping the radical. Similarly, descendants of Ji Zai, who was granted another fief of the same name in Shandong by King Wu of Zhou, also simplified the name and adopted it as their surname. The name may also be derived from a fief of the name Cheng 成 in the state of Lu. Descendants of a Cheng Hu (成虎), son of the ruler of Chu Ruo'ao, also adopted Cheng as their surname. Others are descendants of Tu Ge invaders and other tribes in China.

The Chéng (程) surname may have come from a fief named Cheng in Henan, as well as another in Shaanxi.

See article on Zheng for the origins of the surname Zheng (鄭).

== Notable people surnamed 程 ==
- Cheng Bing, official of Eastern Wu in the Three Kingdoms period
- Cheng Hong, spouse of Chinese Premier Li Keqiang, an English professor at the Capital University of Economics and Business
- Cheng Lianzhen, Chinese politician and bandit
- Cheng Lei, Chinese-born Australian television news anchor and business reporter
- Cheng Pu, general serving under the warlord Sun Quan in the late Eastern Han dynasty
- Cheng Qian, a Chinese military general in the late 1910s
- Cheng Wei-hao, Taiwanese film director and screenwriter
- Cheng Yu, official serving under the warlord Cao Cao in the late Eastern Han dynasty
- Cheng Zilong, Chinese diver
- Andrea Cheng, Hungarian-American author
- Brian Ching, an American-born Chinese football player
- Ch'eng Mao-yün, composer
- Ching Cheong (Cheng Xiang), Chinese journalist with the Singapore newspaper The Straits Times, imprisoned in China for five years on charges of espionage
- François Cheng, French writer, poet and calligrapher
- Henry Thia, Singaporean actor and comedian
- Shawn Thia, Singaporean actor
- Jiaxin Cheng (born 1974), Chinese-born cellist, wife of Julian Lloyd Webber
- Willard Cheng, ABS-CBN News and Current Affairs Malacañang correspondent
- Woeser (Han name Cheng Wensa [程文萨]), Tibetan poet and essayist
- John S. Chen [程守宗], CEO of Blackberry
- Chung Ling Soo, [程連蘇] stage name of the American magician William Ellsworth Robinson
- Cheng Xiao, singer, dancer, member of the South Korean group Cosmic Girls
- Andrew Cherng, Chinese-born American restaurateur and founder of Panda Express
- Sheue-yann Cheng, American molecular geneticist
- Tsung-Che Cheng, Taiwanese born MLB player
- Xinyi Cheng (程心怡, born 1989), Chinese figurative painter
- Yingda Cheng (程颖达, born 1983), Chinese-American mathematician

== Notable people surnamed 成 ==
- Cheng Dechen, general of the Chu state in the Spring and Autumn period
- Cheng Yi, Chinese actor and singer
- Seng Han Thong (成汉通), Singaporean former Member of Parliament

== Forename ==
Additionally, depending on the character, Cheng can be a forename. Cheng usually is only seen to be applied to the last name due to the meaning and nature of the chosen 'Cheng', if it was '成' where it means 'to become' then it is suited best as a last name as it symbolises a foreseeing connotation and would make more sense at the end of a name, but also in Chinese name layout, the last name is usually said first. whereas if it were '澄' meaning 'clarity', then it would be more likely seen as a first name, this usually appears in the middle of the name in Chinese format.

== Others ==
- Hummer Cheng, founder of the famous unlicensed game company Hummer Team.
- Leslie Cheng, American mathematician
- Marita Cheng (born 1989), Australian roboticist
- Maggie Cheng, American fictional character
- Olivia Cheng, Canadian actress
