= 2013 Queen's Birthday Honours (Australia) =

The Queen's Birthday Honours 2013 were announced on 10 June 2013 by the Governor General of Australia, Quentin Bryce.

† indicates an award given posthumously.

== Order of Australia ==
=== Companion (AC) ===
==== General Division ====
Order of Australia General Division ribbon

Order of Australia Military Division ribbon

- James Crawford – of Cambridge – United Kingdom. For eminent service to the law through significant contributions to international and constitutional legal practice, reform and arbitration, and as a leading jurist, academic and author.
- Jill Ker Conway – of Boston – United States of America. For eminent service to the community, particularly women, as an author, academic and through leadership roles with corporations, foundations, universities and philanthropic groups. (Note: Jill Ker Conway was removed as a Companion on 12 June and appointed as an Honorary Companion due to lack of Australian citizenship.)

=== Officer (AO) ===
==== General Division ====
- Professor Christopher James Baggoley – For distinguished service to medicine, particularly in the area of emergency medicine as a clinician, to medical administration and public health care, and to education.
- The Honourable Justice John Harris Byrne RFD – For distinguished service to the judiciary and to the law, particularly in Queensland, as a leading contributor to legal education and reform, and to professional development and training.
- Barbara Amy Cail AM – For distinguished service to public health through advocacy and advisory roles for people with Alzheimer's disease, to the advancement of social welfare and equity, and to the arts.
- Doctor Kenneth Willis Cato – For distinguished service to the graphic design profession as a practitioner, and through education and development roles both nationally and internationally.
- Professor Simon Fenton Chapman – For distinguished service to medical research as an academic and author, particularly in the area of public health policy, and to the community.
- Ronald William Clarke MBE – For distinguished service to the community through a range of leadership roles with local government and philanthropic organisations, and to the promotion of athletics.
- Robert Dickerson – For distinguished service to the visual arts as a figurative painter, and to the community through support for a range of cultural, medical research and social welfare organisations.
- Professor Graham Farquhar – For distinguished service to science in the areas of plant physiology and climate change as a leading researcher, academic and author.
- James Malcolm Freemantle – For distinguished service to the community of Western Australia as a contributor to social welfare, church and sporting organisations, through senior business and financial roles, and to the arts.
- Jennie George – For distinguished service to industrial relations, to the Parliament of Australia, and to the community.
- Petro Georgiou – For distinguished service to the Parliament of Australia, to multiculturalism and human rights advocacy, and to the community.
- Fiona Margaret Hall – For distinguished service to the visual arts as a painter, sculptor and photographer, and to art education.
- Peter Noel Harris – For distinguished service to public administration through leadership and policy reform roles in the areas of telecommunications, the environment, primary industry and transport.
- Gabi Hollows – For distinguished service to public health as an advocate for the eradication of blindness, particularly for Indigenous Australians and people in the developing world.
- Professor Garry Lawrence Jennings AM – For distinguished service to medical research, particularly the prevention and control of cardiovascular disease, obesity and diabetes, to professional associations, and to education.
- Doctor Simon Allen Longstaff – For distinguished service to the community through the promotion of ethical standards in governance and business, to improving corporate responsibility, and to philosophy.
- Associate Professor John Clark McBain – For distinguished service to reproductive medicine as a gynaecologist, particularly in the area of infertility, to medical education as an academic, and to professional organisations.
- Professor Shirley Elizabeth McKechnie OAM – For distinguished service to the performing arts, particularly dance, to the education and development of dancers and Choreographers, and to research.
- Emeritus Professor Thomas Alexander McMeekin – For distinguished service to science, particularly in the discipline of agricultural microbiology, as an academic and author, and to the development of food safety standards and education.
- Professor Robert John Norman – For distinguished service to medicine in the field of reproductive health through significant contributions as a researcher and clinician.
- Margaret O'Donnell – For distinguished service to public administration in Queensland, particularly in the arts sector, to the community through leadership roles in cultural, public health and social welfare organisations, and to legal education.
- June Oscar – For distinguished service to the Indigenous community of Western Australia, particularly through health and social welfare programs.
- Doctor Michael Pearson – For distinguished service to cultural heritage conservation and management, through contributions to professional organisations, and as an educator and researcher.
- Heather Ridout – For distinguished service to business and industry through significant contributions to the development of economic and public policy.
- Emeritus Professor Alan David Robson AM – For distinguished service to tertiary education through governance and administrative roles, to the advancement of scientific and medical research, and to the community.
- Mary Cornelia Salce – For distinguished service to women, particularly in rural communities, through leadership and advocacy roles, and to water conservation and management.
- Gregory John Vickery AM – For distinguished service to the international community through leadership and governance of humanitarian aid organisations.
- Barbara Wieland – For distinguished service to public administration in, and to the community of, South Australia through the delivery and reform of mental health services.

==== Military Division ====
===== Army =====
- Major General Peter Warwick Gilmore DSC AM – For distinguished service as Special Operations Commander Australia, Commander of the International Security Assistance Force Special Operations Forces, and Deputy Special Operations Commander Australia.

===== Air Force =====
- Air Vice-Marshal Kevin John Paule AM – For distinguished service as the Head of Military Strategic Commitments and Commander Integrated Area Defence System.

=== Member (AM) ===
==== General Division ====
- Philip Stanley Aiken – For significant service to international relations through the promotion of Australian trade in the United Kingdom.
- Joy Cecile Anderson – For significant service to community health and education, particularly through the Australian Breastfeeding Association.
- Stanley Alexander Archard – For significant service to irrigated agriculture, and to conservation.
- Dr Alan Cameron Archer PSM – For significant service to agricultural education, and to heritage management and conservation.
- The Honourable Justice David John Ashley – For significant service to the judiciary and the law, and to the beef cattle industry.
- Dr Robert Arthur Barr – For significant service to engineering, particularly electrical energy supply and distribution.
- Dr Elaine Frances Barry – For significant service to the community through social welfare organisations, and to education.
- Michael John Bassingthwaighte – For significant service to the health insurance industry, and to the community of the Illawarra region.
- Dr Paul Ernest Beaumont – For significant service to medicine, particularly in the field of ophthalmology.
- John William Berryman – For significant service to people with a disability, and to the community.
- The Honourable Mrs Rosalind Marianne Blades – For significant service to local government, and to the community of the Greater Dandenong region.
- Les Blakebrough – For significant service to the visual arts as a ceramicist and educator and through professional artistic associations.
- Professor Nikolai Bogduk – For significant service to medical research and education, particularly in the specialties of anatomy, spinal health and chronic pain management.
- Dr Brian David Bowring – For significant service to medicine in rural and regional areas, and as a general practitioner.
- Michael Brady – For significant service to the community, and to music as a composer and performer.
- Alexander Norman Brennan – For significant service to business and commerce, to tertiary education administration, and to the community.
- Jacqueline Brown – For significant service to agricultural education in Tasmania.
- Elizabeth Blomfield Bryan – For significant service to the financial services and superannuation sectors, and to corporate governance.
- Kristal Irene Buckley – For significant service to conservation and the environment, particularly in the area of cultural heritage, and to education.
- † Mavis Margaret Burgess –For significant service to the community of King Island through a range of health, social welfare and volunteer organisations.
- Margaret Frances Burns – For significant service to the community, particularly to children recovering from illness and trauma, and to the entertainment industry.
- Ronald Leslie Burns – For significant service to the community, particularly to children recovering from illness and trauma, and to the entertainment industry.
- William Calabria – For significant service to the wine industry, and to the community of the Riverina.
- Michael Joseph Callaghan PSM – For significant service to public administration, particularly in international economic policy development and financial reform.
- Kim David Carpenter – For significant service to the performing arts.
- Professor Cordia Mingyeuk Chu – For significant service to reproductive and public health programs.
- Dr Anthony Collins – For significant service to dentistry, and to the community.
- William Delafield Cook – For significant service to the visual arts as a realist painter of Australian landscapes.
- Darryl Desmond Courtney-O'Connor – For significant service to the tourism and hospitality sector, and to the development of industry education.
- Anne Gabrielle Crawford – For significant service to the community, particularly through the promotion of health and fitness to raise funds for cancer research.
- Robin Ann Dalton – For significant service to the film industry as a producer, literary agent and author, and as a mentor to emerging actors and writers.
- Maree Lynn Davidson – For significant service to the Indigenous community, and to the welfare of children and multicultural youth.
- Ivor Arthur Davies – For significant service to the music and entertainment industry as a songwriter and performer, and to the community.
- Colin William Dillon APM – For significant service to the Indigenous community of Queensland.
- Dr Martin Bryn Dooland – For significant service to public dental health.
- Dr Kevin Adrian Doyle – For significant service to veterinary science, and to animal health programs.
- Peter John Duncan – For significant service to public administration in New South Wales, and to conservation and the environment.
- Colin Wayne Dunsford – For significant service to the community of South Australia, and to the accounting profession.
- Richard Martin Eckersley – For significant service to the community as a researcher, analyst and commentator on population health and well-being in Australia.
- Dr Patricia Margaret Ellis – For significant service to veterinary science, particularly through the development of quarantine and biosecurity protocols in the equine industry.
- Emeritus Professor Norman Alan Etherington – For significant service to education, particularly in the discipline of history, through contributions to heritage preservation, and to the community.
- Cadel Lee Evans – For significant service to cycling, and to the community.
- Dr Eric Charles Fairbank – For significant service to palliative care medicine in regional Victoria.
- Terence Francis Fitzgerald – For significant service to the development of the credit union movement, and to the community.
- Carolyn Lennox Fletcher – For significant service to the community, particularly through the establishment of education and training opportunities for children in Cambodia.
- David Norman Galbally QC – For significant service to the community, particularly through leadership in health organisations and the provision of pro bono legal services.
- Marianne Suleika Gaul – For significant service to nursing, particularly through providing improved emergency health services to rural communities.
- Robert Francis Goode – For significant service to the performing arts and to the community as an organist, harpsichordist and chamber musician.
- Nance Gwyneth Grant MBE – For significant service to the performing arts, particularly opera.
- Ronald Norman Haddrick MBE – For significant service to the performing arts as an actor and narrator.
- Dr John Meredith Harrison – For significant service to orthopaedic medicine, and to water polo.
- Nanette Louise Hassall – For significant service to the performing arts, particularly through dance education.
- Susan Hawick – For significant service to education, particularly through the school counselling profession.
- Anthony Robert Hedley – For significant service to business, particularly the property sector, and to the community of Canberra.
- Professor John Raymond Hopkins OBE – For significant service to the performing arts, particularly as a conductor, to music education, and to the community.
- The Honourable Michael James Horan – For significant service to the Parliament of Queensland, and to the community of the Darling Downs.
- Trevor Colin Horman – For significant service to the Northern Territory, particularly through heritage preservation, the motor racing industry, and the engineering profession.
- Elizabeth Ann Hounslow – For significant service to the community through organisations promoting social justice, Indigenous health and human rights.
- Dr Duncan Standon Ironmonger – For significant service to economics as a researcher, author and academic.
- Leesa Madonna Jeffcoat – For significant service to the Catholic education system in Queensland, and to the community.
- Timothy Kain – For significant service to music as a classical guitarist, educator and mentor.
- Professor Siri Kannangara – For significant service to medicine, particularly in the field of sports medicine and rheumatology.
- † Emeritus Professor Antoni Emil Karbowiak – For significant service to tertiary education in the field of electrical engineering, and to science and technology as a researcher in the field of telecommunications.
- Peter John Knight – For significant service to the community, particularly through support to the homeless, and to engineering.
- Colin Herbert Koch – For significant service to arts administration, particularly the development of Indigenous art and culture.
- Katie Lahey – For significant service to business and commerce, and to the arts.
- Jill Lang – For significant service to the community, and to the not-for-profit sector.
- Dr Hugh John Lavery – For significant service to the environment and conservation.
- John Danvers Leece OAM – For significant service to the community, particularly to the Scouting movement, and to philanthropy.
- Professor Peter Adrian Leggat – For significant service to medicine as a specialist in the fields of tropical and travel medicine.
- Lyn Lennox – For significant service to occupational therapy, particularly through support to children with developmental and learning difficulties.
- Frances Irma Lindsay – For significant service to the arts, particularly as a curator and administrator in galleries and museums.
- Professor Yew-Chaye Loo – For significant service to civil and structural engineering.
- Robert Martin Lunn QC – For significant service to the judiciary of South Australia, particularly as the author of texts relating to civil procedure and criminal law, and to the community.
- Christine Kris Macauley – For significant service to business in the Australian Capital Territory.
- Andrew John Mahar – For significant service to the community and social justice through the provision of access to technology, and to Timor Leste.
- Susan Craig Maple-Brown – For significant service to youth through the Guiding movement, and to the community.
- Michael James Martin – For significant service to the surf lifesaving movement.
- Robert Michael McCarthy – For significant service to public administration in Queensland, particularly in the areas of economic development, agriculture and natural resource management.
- The Honourable James Andrew McGinty – For significant service to the Parliament of Western Australia, to law reform, and to the community.
- Dr Edgeworth David McIntyre – For significant service to orthopaedic medicine as a surgeon and an educator.
- Simone Irene McMahon – For significant service to community health through the promotion and awareness of organ donation and transplantation.
- Suzanne Lydia Medway – For significant service to wildlife conservation.
- The Honourable Dean Mildren RFD, QC – For significant service to the judiciary and to the law in the Northern Territory.
- Dr Francis Xavier Moloney – For significant service to medicine, particularly in the field of anaesthesia.
- David Ernest Montgomery – For significant service to agriculture, particularly the potato industry.
- Elizabeth Maria Morgan – For significant service to music education, particularly of the violin.
- Peter Gwyn Morgan – For significant service to public sector governance in Tasmania, and to the community.
- William Mortimer Muirhead – For significant service to the community of South Australia through the promotion of international trade.
- The Honourable Mr Paul Robert Munro – For significant service to workplace relations, the trade union movement, and to industrial law.
- His Honour Judge Matthew David Myers – For significant service to the community, particularly in the area of family law and welfare.
- Aarne Olavi Neeme – For significant service to the performing arts as a director and educator in theatre and television.
- Winthrop Professor John Phillipps Newnham – For significant service to medicine in the field of obstetrics.
- John Nicolakis – For significant service to the Australian-Greek community of the Northern Territory.
- Richard James Owens OAM – For significant service to the community, particularly in the Hunter region.
- Stephen Richard Phillips – For significant service to arts administration in the field of opera.
- The Reverend Dr David Arthur Pitman – For significant service to the Uniting Church in Australia, to the promotion of ecumenism, and to education.
- Des Powell – For significant service to business and commerce, and to the community.
- Lewis Pretorius – For significant service to the community of Tasmania, and to Rotary International.
- Graham Henry Price – For significant service to the primary industry sector, particularly through the development of soil testing programs.
- The Most Reverend Michael Ernest Putney – For significant service to the Catholic Church in Australia, to the promotion of inter-faith dialogue, and to the community of Townsville.
- Merlyn Quaife – For significant service to music.
- Councillor Catherine Joan Redwood – For significant service to the community of Victoria.
- Kenneth Reginald Reed – For significant service to the performing and visual arts as a supporter and philanthropist.
- Glenn Eric Rees – For significant service to community health, particularly aged care, Alzheimer's disease and dementia.
- Dr David Charles Rentz – For significant service to science, particularly in the field of entomology, and to the community.
- † David Jerome Roche – For significant service to the community, particularly as a benefactor to cultural institutions.
- Dr John Graham Rogers – For significant service to medicine in the fields of clinical genetics and paediatrics.
- Rowan Alexander Ross – For significant service to arts governance, and to business.
- Katrina Le Breton Rumley – For significant service to the visual arts, particularly in the museums and galleries sector.
- † Graeme Edward Rundle – For significant service to conservation and the environment in Western Australia.
- Marguerite Anne Ryan – For significant service to the community through the development of assistance programs for women and children in Africa.
- Professor Antonio Giuseppe Sagona – For significant service to tertiary education in the field of archaeology.
- Paul Salteri – For significant service to the building and construction industry, and to philanthropy.
- Robert Philip Sessions – For significant service to the Australian publishing industry.
- Dr David Anthony Sheen – For significant service to dentistry, particularly in developing countries.
- Dr Richard Frederick Sheldrake – For significant service to public administration in New South Wales, and to the community.
- Judith Margaret Small – For significant service to folk music, as a songwriter and recording artist.
- Gerard Thomas Stevens – For significant service to the pharmaceutical industry, and to community health.
- Casey Joel Stoner – For significant service to motorcycle racing.
- Doreen Stoves PSM – For significant service to the community, particularly through social welfare programs.
- Anna Trehearne Sweeny – For significant service to opera as a teacher of movement and stagecraft.
- Howard Napier Tanner – For significant service to architecture, and to heritage conservation.
- Robert Waddell Taylor – For significant service to youth through the Scouting movement, and to the community.
- Ross Taylor – For significant service to Australia-Indonesia relations, to primary industry and transport, and to the community.
- Professor Philip Douglas Thompson – For significant service to neurology, particularly in the field of Parkinson's disease and movement disorders.
- Adjunct Professor Ralph Tobias – For significant service to the development and commercialisation of technological innovations.
- Constantine Dionysios Vertzayias – For significant service to the Australian-Greek community.
- Professor Euan Morrison Wallace – For significant service to medicine, particularly in the areas of obstetrics and gynaecology.
- Professor Robyn Lynne Ward – For significant service to medical research and patient care in the field of oncology.
- Dr Lynn Maria Weekes – For significant service to community health through the promotion of quality use of medicines.
- Dr Peter Harold Woodruff – For significant service to medicine, particularly in the field of vascular surgery and through contributions to healthcare standards.
- Dr Jennifer Margaret Wray – For significant service to medicine in rural areas, particularly in the community of Narooma.
- Michael Edward Wright – For significant service to business in Western Australia.

==== Military Division ====
===== Navy =====
- Captain Michael Kent Smith RANR – For exceptional performance of duty in the field of Navy workforce design and management.
- Commander Evan Paul Davies CSM RAN – For exceptional service as a Joint Operational Planner at Headquarters Joint Operations Command in support of operations in Afghanistan from January 2007 to December 2012.

===== Army =====
- Brigadier William Timothy Sowry CSC – For exceptional service as Director General Estate Companion Review and Deputy Head Cadet Reserve and Employer Support Division.
- Colonel Andrew Douglas Gallaway – For exceptional service as Commanding Officer of the 1st Battalion, the Royal Australian Regiment, Commanding Officer Joint Task Force 635, Directing Staff at the Australian Command and Staff College and the Director of Soldier Career Management – Army.
- Colonel Brendan Peter Stevens – For exceptional service to the Australian Defence Force in the fields of career management and workforce strategy.
- Colonel Michael George Tucker – For exceptional service to the Australian Army as Director of Military Commitments – Army and Director of Studies – Land, Australian Command and Staff College.
- Lieutenant Colonel Darleen Maree Young RFD – For exceptional service to the Australian Defence Force in the field of education and training.

===== Air Force =====
- Group Captain Michael William Brown – For exceptional performance of duty as Officer Commanding Air Lift Systems Program Office and as Project Director Intelligence, Surveillance and Reconnaissance.
- Wing Commander Mark Louis Masini – For exceptional service to the Australian Defence Force in the field of technical airworthiness standards and regulation.

=== Medal (OAM) ===
==== General Division ====
- Margaret Adcock – For service to the community through a range of sporting and service organisations.
- Angeliki Kay Alexiou – For service to women's health, and to the community.
- Warrant Officer Class One David John Allen – For meritorious service as the Regimental Sergeant Major of 7th Battalion, the Royal Australian Regiment; Regimental Sergeant Major, Mentoring and Reconstruction Task Force One; and Regimental Sergeant Major, Combat Training Centre.
- Renie Ann Allison-Martini – For service to the performing arts, particularly through dance education.
- Henrietta Altman – For service to the community, particularly through the Jewish Holocaust Centre.
- Kyriakos Amanatidis – For service to the Australian-Greek community, as an author and educator and through a range of cultural organisations.
- Kenneth Frederick Anderson – For service to the community of Wee Waa through a range of fundraising and community initiatives.
- Emmanuela Antonelli – For service to aged welfare, particularly within the Australian-Italian community.
- Jeanette Ann Antrum – For service to social welfare, and to the community of Port Stephens.
- Bruce Edwin Armstrong – For service to music, particularly brass bands, and to the community of Warragul.
- Nea Barrie Armstrong – For service to the community of Bellingen.
- Dalia Bluma Ayalon Sinclair – For service to the Jewish community.
- Karen Yvonne Bailey – For service to education, particularly through the promotion of the Indonesian language and culture.
- Elizabeth Marion Bailey – For service to the community through raising the awareness of mental health.
- Jayne Alison Bates – For service to local government, and to the community of Kangaroo Island.
- David Alfred Beaumont – For service to the community, particularly through heritage organisations.
- Trevor Ian Beckingham – For service to the community of Queensland through contributions to accountancy and business associations, to representative sport, and to agriculture.
- Ailsa Mae Bennett – For service to athletics.
- June Marie Bennett – For service to music, and to the community of Broken Hill.
- Johannis Hendrik Berg – For service to recreational walking.
- Kathleen Ann Berg – For service to recreational walking.
- Roy Alfred Berryman – For service to the arts through a range of photographic organisations, and to the community of the Gippsland region.
- Betty Biffin – For service to the community of Liverpool, particularly through contributions to the care of the elderly.
- John Ronald Biffin – For service to the community, particularly through Australia Day celebrations.
- Beverly May Bills – For service to the visual and textile arts.
- David Nisbet Binks – For service to sailing.
- David Fothergill Bird – For service to the community of Albany.
- Noel Warren Bissett – For service to sport, particularly rugby league.
- Naida Elizabeth Blackley – For service to education as a music teacher.
- Lloyd David Blazely – For service to the community, particularly through the Salamanca Arts Centre.
- Lucia Bokulic – For service to the community of the Manning Valley through a range of community and multicultural organisations.
- Kevin Ronald Bolton – For service to tennis, particularly as an administrator and umpire.
- Carol Elissa Boothman – For service to the arts as an educator.
- Wendy Georgina Bowman – For service to the community of the Upper Hunter.
- Mostyn Arthur Bray – For service to horticulture through the cultivation and propagation of orchids.
- Mervyn Victor Brill – For service to the community of Temora.
- Kenneth Rae Broadbent – For service to the community through a range of service organisations.
- Judith Grace Bromfield – For service to local government, and to the community of the Derwent Valley.
- Christopher Larry Brooker – For service to the community of the Sunshine Coast.
- Christopher Herbert Brown – For service to the community, particularly to people with a disability.
- Heather Anne Brown – For service to people with a disability.
- Margaret Eunice Brown – For service to the community.
- Mervyn John Brown – For service to the veteran community of Queensland.
- Russell Stuart Brown – For service to the arts, particularly theatre in the Canberra region.
- Allan Vincent Browne – For service to music as a jazz musician, and to the community.
- Patrick Bugden – For service to the Catholic Church in New South Wales through financial administrative roles.
- Jean Elizabeth Buist – For service to the community through a range of organisations, and to women.
- Patricia Bulluss – For service to the community of Wangaratta through a range of organisations.
- Alan David Bulmer – For service to the Anglican Church, and to the community of Cressy.
- Andrew Roy Cameron – For service to nursing, particularly through a range of roles with the International Committee of the Red Cross.
- Richard Rodney Cameron – For service to the livestock and property industries through the administration of state and national professional bodies.
- Phillip Norman Campbell – For service to engineering.
- Warrant Officer Frederick Lindsay Campbell – For meritorious service in the field of aviation maintenance and for leadership as a Warrant Officer in HMA Ships Cerberus and Creswell.
- Elaine Carr – For service to hockey as a player and administrator.
- Arthur John Carruthers – For service to veterans and their families.
- Noel Leslie Causer – For service to the community, particularly through the provision of humanitarian aid in Papua New Guinea.
- Ian John Cavanagh – For service to youth, particularly through the Australian Army Cadets.
- Jennifer Joy Chapman – For service to music as an educator and musical director.
- Mary Blanche Chapman – For service to the community of Tamworth.
- Wing Commander Stephen Gareth Chappell – For meritorious service to the Royal Australian Air Force in the field of Air Combat.
- Stephan Dmytro Chomyn – For service to the Ukrainian community of Brisbane.
- Zenon Chorkawja – For service to the Ukrainian Catholic Church in Australia.
- Desmond John Clark – For service to the community of Inverell.
- Norman Clarke – For service to veterans and their families.
- Brian Tolcher Clay – For service to conservation and the environment, and to the community of Dunsborough.
- Pauline Ann Clay – For service to conservation and the environment, and to the community of Dunsborough.
- Stephen Frederick Coffey – For service to the community, particularly children.
- Rosa Colanero – For service to the community as an advocate for women and multiculturalism.
- Valda Rae Cole – For service to the community of Tocumwal.
- Shirley Margaret Coleman – For service to the community of Milton and Ulladulla.
- William James Collett – For service to the community of Portland and the Shire of Glenelg.
- Mervyn Wesley Comini – For service to the community through a range of organisations.
- Kevin Michael Connelly – For service to hockey.
- Warrant Officer Michael David Connors – For meritorious service as the Defence Administrative Assistant in Dili, East Timor, the senior Naval Police Coxswain at HMAS Cerberus and Ship's Warrant Officer in HMAS Sydney.
- Jacqueline Elizabeth Cookes – For service to the retail bookselling industry.
- Beverley Fay Cooney – For service to humanitarian aid in Peru.
- Langtree Eric Coppin – For service to the community of the East Pilbara.
- Margaret Mary Corbett – For service to netball.
- Erica Marie Costigan – For service to the community through contributions to remembrance of the AHS Centaur.
- Rodney John Coy – For service to the community through charitable organisations.
- Sue Crawford – For service to the community through contributions to Honorary Justice programs.
- Desmond Frank Crawley – For service to the community of Western Australia.
- Claudia Cream – For service to the Chinese community of South Australia.
- Ronald Alwyn Critcher – For service to youth and the Scouting movement, and to the community.
- Richard Eric Crooke – For service to the community, and to yachting.
- Robert McBeath Croser – For service to the arts through contributions to amateur theatre as a director and mentor.
- Anthony Charles Culberg – For service to the community of Tasmania.
- Martin Joseph Culkin – For service to education in Victoria, and as an advocate for innovative approaches in teaching and learning.
- Terrence Leslie Cummins – For service to sport, particularly scuba diving.
- Suzanne Currie – For service to the community of Kilkivan.
- Margaret Joan Daniels – For service to the community, particularly through Rotary International.
- Denise Dapre – For service to the sport of fencing.
- Maureen Fay Davenport – For service to the blind and partially sighted.
- Paul Christopher Davey – For service to veterinary science.
- Audrey Claire Davis – For service to netball.
- Donald John Davis – For service to the community of Nundle, and to the Milton-Ulladulla region.
- Keith Edwin Davis – For service to the community of the Illawarra region, and to local government.
- Elizabeth Ann Dawson – For service to the community of Canberra.
- Alma Margot de Rebeira – For service to ornithology.
- Claudius Pereira de Rebeira – For service to ornithology.
- John Brendan Deacon – For service to judo, and to the community of Tasmania.
- Valerie Ruby Deakin – For service to Indigenous communities in Western Australia and the Northern Territory.
- Russell Leslie Deal – For service to social work education, and to the community.
- Margaret Anne Dears – For service to athletes with a disability.
- Warrant Officer Class One Steven John Di Tullio – For meritorious service as Regimental Sergeant Major of the 6th Engineer Support Regiment, the 2nd Combat Engineer Regiment and the School of Military Engineering.
- Frank Renfree Dingle – For service to the community through a range of church and youth organisations.
- Paul Anthony Dixon – For service to the community of Wyong.
- Peggy Irene Docksey – For service to veterans and their families.
- Graham John Don – For service to the community of Springvale, and to ex-service welfare.
- Joyce Mary Donghi – For service to the community of Bundaberg.
- Peter Paul Donghi – For service to the community of Bundaberg.
- Andrew Leslie Downie – For service to the community, particularly through Lifeline.
- Gary John Doyle – For service to the community of Mungindi.
- Walter George Drinkwater – For service to the community through the provision of first aid services.
- Johannes Dronryp – For service to judo.
- Lorraine Marietta Eckersley – For service to the community of Tamworth.
- Hazel Eileen Edwards – For service to literature.
- Henry William Ellis – For service to the community of Tamworth.
- Ross Andrew Ellis – For service to speleology as an author and editor.
- Elwyn Edgar Elms – For service to the law in New South Wales, and to the community.
- Megan Lesley Etheridge – For service to the community, particularly women.
- Barbara Eva Evans – For service to politics and the community of the Adelaide Hills.
- Mary Excell – For service to the community of Hobart.
- Donald Henry Eyb – For service to equestrian sports.
- Bob John Fairclough – For service to the community of the Werribee region, and to education.
- Omar Mohamud Farah – For service to the Somali community of Melbourne.
- Mark Anthony Fife – For service to the community through leadership roles in surf lifesaving.
- Allan John Fisher – For service to the community of Chiltern and the Shire of Indigo.
- Eliot Russell Fisher – For service to youth through the Australian Navy Cadets, and to the community through a range of emergency service and local government organisations.
- Alexis Helen Fitzgerald – For service to the community of Esk, particularly through choir and music.
- Arthur Trevor Foote – For service to the community, and to the Uniting Church in Australia.
- Liela Agnes Ford – For service to the community of south west Queensland.
- Ian Francis Fowler – For service to athletes with a disability.
- Evelyn Christine France – For service to art.
- Robert Gordon Fraser – For service to the community of the Central Coast.
- Sarah Elizabeth Fraser – For service to librarianship and school information services.
- Brian David Friend – For service to touch football, and to the community of Manly Warringah.
- Alexander Frederick Fulcher – For service to cycling.
- Rodney James Fyffe – For service to local government, and to the community.
- Roseanna Gallo – For service to the community, particularly through singing and entertainment.
- Robert James Gatherum – For service to the community through the Lions movement.
- John Gelling – For service to education and to the teaching profession through a range of leadership roles.
- John Richard George – For service to the welfare of children in Cambodia.
- Dorothy Martin Gillespie – For service to the community through leadership roles in school and community groups.
- Dorothy Ellen Gillis – For service to the community through historical research and the preservation of heritage sites in the Illawarra region.
- Kevin James Gillis – For service to the community through historical research and the preservation of heritage sites in the Illawarra region.
- Raffaele Giuliani – For service to football in the Shepparton region.
- Abram Goldberg – For service to the Jewish community in Melbourne, and as a proponent of Yiddish language and culture.
- Trevor Edward Gray – For service to the communities of Inglewood and Texas.
- Belinda Lynette Green – For service to the community.
- Jacolyn Dorothy Greenow – For service to local government, and to the community, particularly to people with disabilities.
- Kenneth John Grieg – For service to the preservation, commemoration and promotion of Australian naval heritage.
- Janice Fay Grieve – For service to the community of Ipswich.
- Eric Peter Guazzo – For service to neurosurgery.
- Malcolm Stuart Hackett – For service to the community of the Strathewen area in the aftermath of the 2009 Victorian bushfires.
- Allan Edward Hale – For service to the community, particularly to people with a disability.
- Margaret Beverley Hall – For service to motor sport in South Australia.
- Peter Edward Hall – For service to motor sport in South Australia.
- Lieutenant Colonel Vincent Edward Hallinan – For service to veterans and their families, and to the community.
- David Graham Halton – For service to veterans.
- Deadre Joan Ham – For service to the community of Belmont.
- John David Hamann – For service to athletics.
- Dennis William Hanmer – For service to the veterans' community.
- Janice Mary Harper – For service to the community through the promotion of equal opportunities for women.
- Leslie Ian Harper – For service to the community through a range of church and welfare organisations.
- Phoebe Ruth Hawkins – For service to the community of Maroondah.
- Douglas Elwyn Hawley – For service to the community of Canterbury.
- Edward Jonathan Hayes – For service to agricultural science, and to the community.
- Christine Alice Healy – For service to the community through family planning and women's health.
- Warren John Hegarty – For service to veterans and their families, and to the community of Townsville.
- Kenneth William Hemmens – For service to the performing arts, and to education.
- Eileen Ellis Henderson – For service to veterans and nursing.
- Jennifer Henderson – For service to education through the promotion of the study of mathematics.
- Lorraine June Henderson – For service to the community of Ballarat.
- Ruth Doreen Hiatt – For service to religious education, and to community welfare.
- Myra Dallas Hill – For service to the community of Cessnock, particularly through music.
- Jill Lorraine Hillary – For service to international relations through health programs in Timor-Leste.
- Lynette Margaret Holdsworth – For service to conservation and the environment, and to the community of Melton.
- Beverley Diane Holuigue – For service to the hospitality industry as a cook, teacher and author.
- Mary Horder – For service to the community of western Sydney.
- Raymond George Hunt – For service to the community of the Northern Rivers region.
- Terence Lancelot Hunt – For service to the community of Kempsey, and to local government.
- Margaret Anne Hunter – For service to the community, particularly through support for women in the legal profession.
- Margaret Huntley – For service to the community, particularly veterans and their families.
- Robin James Imlach – For service to veterans and their families, and to the community.
- Ross William Ingram – For service to the community of the Blue Mountains.
- Judith Anne Inkster – For service to farming communities.
- Norman James Innis – For service to surfing.
- Bruce David Irvine – For service to veterans and their families, and to the community of Bathurst.
- Jean Jackson – For service to the community through multicultural education roles.
- William Brame Jamieson – For service to the surf lifesaving movement.
- Jean Winton Jansen – For service to the community through a range of voluntary roles.
- David George Jarman – For service to the community of the Mornington Peninsula, and to local government.
- Todd Alexander Jasper – For service to the community, particularly homeless youth.
- Diana Maria Jazic – For service to social welfare through the provision of support programs for homeless people.
- Arthur George Jeeves – For service to the community through the preservation of local history and historical sites.
- Maurice Alfred Johns – For service to the community of Alice Springs.
- Leo Stanley Johnson – For service to the community of Melton through a range of employment, education and social welfare organisations.
- Archibald Craig Johnston – For service to local government, and to the community of Glamorgan.
- Melville Earl Johnston – For service to the sheep shearing industry.
- Christopher Milton Johnstone – For service to the community of the Whyalla region.
- Christine Margaret Jones – For service to the community of Nambour.
- Heather Marion Joynes – For service to arts and crafts, particularly embroidery.
- Peter Robert Junor – For service to the community of Queanbeyan through a range of social welfare and community development initiatives.
- John Frederick Kaehler – For service to veterans and their families.
- Maureen Florence Ker – For service to the community of White Cliffs.
- Steven Tae Hong Kim – For service to the welfare of Korean war veterans.
- Judith Elsie King – For service to the community of Circular Head.
- Robert Charles Kirchner – For service to the arts, and to the community.
- Gregory John Kirk – For service to the community, particularly veterans and their families.
- Enid Shirley Kirton – For service the community of the Sutherland Shire.
- Ronald Edward Kitchingman – For service to the community of Manningham.
- Michael John Kluge – For service to the community of the Murray Mallee.
- Raymond Stuart Knight – For service to the community, particularly through support for medical research.
- Dr Arcot Sampath Kumar – For service to the community of Canowindra, particularly as a general practitioner.
- Angus Thomas Lane – For service to agricultural shows.
- Dallas Ann Langdon – For service to youth through the Guiding movement.
- Marian Fay Langdon – For service to youth through the Guiding movement.
- Janet Laverty – For service to the community of the Wingecarribee Shire.
- Trevor John Lawrence – For service to the veteran community.
- Clarie Pik Kwan Lee – For service to the community of the Hills district.
- Warwick St Clair Leeson – For service to the community of St Andrews, particularly in the aftermath of the 2009 Victorian bushfires.
- Robert William Legge – For service to local government, and to the community.
- Jennifer Leigh – For service to people with a disability, particularly through the development of accessible community transport systems and programs.
- Christopher John Lennings – For service to psychology, and to the community.
- Brian Joseph Lenton – For service to the community of Bendigo.
- Jane Levick – For service to the community of Dungog.
- Alan Franklyn Lewis – For service to the community of Malvern.
- Robert Liddle –For service to the community through roles with Indigenous organisations, particularly in the oil exploration and production industry.
- Andrew Lloyd – For service to athletics, particularly running.
- Robert Grantley Lloyd – For service to cricket as a player, coach, and administrator.
- Harry Lohmer – For service to the community, particularly through The Salvation Army.
- Cecil Claude Long – For service to the community of north west Tasmania.
- Peter Robert Lowson – For service to Indigenous youth.
- Bryson Charles Luff – For service to the community of Gilgandra.
- John Patrick Lynch – For service to the community of Romsey.
- James Clayton MacCormick – For service to architecture.
- Lynette Campbell MacInnis – For service to the community of Taree.
- Kevin John Mackay – For service to education.
- Darrell Gilbert Maher – For service to the veterans' community.
- Amanda Jane Maltabarow – For service to the community, particularly through raising awareness of breast cancer.
- Barry Maxwell Maney – For service to the community of Mount Gambier.
- Susan Marie Manton – For service to palliative care, and to the community of Gympie.
- Richmond Stuart Manyweathers – For service to the community, particularly through Rotary International.
- James Herbert Marsden – For service to the community of Campbelltown.
- Daryl George Marshall – For service to the community, particularly through emergency service organisations.
- Michelle Martin – For service to squash.
- Mary Norine Mathews – For service to the community through a range health and welfare organisations.
- Warrant Officer Class One Christopher Walton Mayfield – For meritorious service as Master Gunner Proof and Experimental Establishment Graytown and as the Regimental Sergeant Major 8th/12th Regiment, the Royal Regiment of Australian Artillery.
- Rupert McCall – For service to the community, particularly as a poet.
- Thomas Marian McClelland – For service to the community of the Tamworth region, particularly through the preservation of local history.
- Stuart Gerrand McClure – For service to hang gliding.
- Wallace McGillivray – For service to the community, particularly veterans and their families.
- Edna Sinclair McGuinness – For service to the community of the Southern Highlands.
- James Kerry McGuire – For service to sport, particularly for people who are blind or partially sighted.
- Dr Douglas Bruce McInnes – For service to geotechnical engineering, and to a range of professional organisations.
- Associate Professor Ian Edgeworth McInnes – For service to medical surgery.
- Heather Colleen McKean – For service to the performing arts as a country music entertainer and promoter.
- John James McKeough – For service to the taxi industry in the Australian Capital Territory, and to the community.
- Ian George McKnight – For service to lawn bowls.
- Marjorie McLachlan – For service to the community through support for people in need.
- Peter Frank McNay – For service to the veteran community.
- Brian Raymond McWhirter – For service to the community through a range of charitable and service groups.
- Wayne Meech – For service to veterans.
- Rodney John Meeke – For service to the community, particularly veterans and their families.
- Abdirahman Aden Mohamud – For service to the Somali community of south east Queensland.
- Mohamed Firdausy Mohideen – For service to the muslim community of Victoria.
- Jeannie Frances Mok – For service to the community through multicultural organisations.
- Enid Gladys Monaghan – For service to the community, particularly those affected by arthritis.
- Felice Montrone – For service to the Italian community.
- Alan John Moran – For service to the community of Penrith, particularly through health support organisations.
- Gabrielle Moran – For service to the community of Penrith, particularly through health support organisations.
- Bruce David Morcombe – For service to the community through safety awareness programs for children.
- Denise Marie Morcombe – For service to the community through safety awareness programs for children.
- John Gerald Moriarty – For service to cricket, and to the community of the Central Coast.
- Marion Elsie Morrison – For service to the community of eastern Sydney, particularly through youth, church and amateur theatre groups.
- Patricia Margaret Mowbray – For service to people with a disability.
- Kerry William Muddle – For service to the community of Dungog.
- Kenneth Neil Mulligan – For service to the community, particularly Townsville, and to youth.
- John Mullins – For service to the community of Warringah.
- Robert George Mundle – For service to sailing, and to journalism.
- Peter Maxwell Munster – For service to the community, particularly through the preservation of the history of St Leonards.
- Garry William Murray – For service to the community of Bankstown, particularly veterans and their families.
- Guiseppe Musso – For service to the Italian community.
- Dr Jonathan Nathan – For service to medical education, particularly in the field of optometry.
- Raymond Samuel Neilson – For service to the community of Dungog.
- Group Captain Ian Andrew Nesbitt – For meritorious service in the field of Air Combat Capability support.
- Judith Mae Nguyen – For service to community health, particularly in the field of arthritis.
- Joan Margery Nicholas – For service to the community through drug education and support, and services to the aged and homeless.
- George Nicolaidis – For service to the community of Blacktown.
- Commander Brian Oswald Nitschinsk – For meritorious service in the field of engineering in the Royal Australian Navy.
- Ronda Lee Nix – For service to hockey.
- David James Noreen – For service to the veterans' community.
- Peter Winter Norman – For service to the community through a range of organisations.
- Julie Chio Nunez – For service to the Filipino community of Blacktown.
- Ross Graham Oakley – For service to sport, particularly Australian rules football and rugby union.
- Maureen Faye Oates – For service to newspaper publishing, and to the community.
- Dr Patrick George O'Neill – For service to medicine in far north Queensland.
- Graham William Ormsby – For service to the community, particularly youth.
- Raymond Anthony O'Shannessy – For service to the community of Benalla.
- Nessie Irene Osten – For service to music, and to the community of Broken Hill.
- Phillip Cecil O'Sullivan – For service to the Waverley region through a range of sporting and community organisations.
- Peter John Painter – For service to the community of Kyogle.
- Margaret Joan Paterson – For service to horticulture through the cultivation and hybridisation of bromeliads.
- Neil Turner Paterson – For service to the community of the Yorke Peninsula.
- Lennox Pawson – For service to the community through a range of charitable organisations.
- Minyon Betty Pfeiffer – For service to the community of Mount Barker.
- Shirley Amy Phelps – For service to the community of Pittwater.
- Trevor Pedro Phillips – For service to the community of Yamba through a range of organisations.
- William Robert Phillpot – For service to the community of Warrnambool.
- Bartholomew Maxwell Plenkovich – For service to the communities of Broadwater and the Lower Richmond River region, and to the sugar cane industry.
- Gary Wilfred Polkinghorne – For service to the community of Port Pirie.
- Graham Charles Portas – For service to the community of Holland Park-Mount Gravatt.
- Daryl John Powell – For service to the community through the teaching, promotion and preservation of Australian folk music and dance.
- Cecily May Prentice – For service to the community of the Central Coast.
- Sylvia Eva Pretti – For service to the community of Manly.
- Harry Procel – For service to the Jewish community and to sport through contributions to the Maccabi movement.
- Ian David Rabbitts – For service to the environment through coast care and environmental conservation.
- Jennifer Arden Raper – For service to the community, particularly in the field of mental health.
- William Henry Raper – For service to the community of Woy Woy.
- Margaret Spehr Reichelt – For service to the community, particularly as a teacher of highland dancing.
- Anthony John Reynolds – For service to the community, particularly through the management of medical research programs.
- Bertram George Richards – For service to the community of Kentish.
- Judith Richards – For service to horse racing, and to the community of Nyngan.
- Robert Milton Richards – For service to cricket, and to youth.
- Warrant Officer Class One Paul Marcus Richardson – For meritorious service as Regimental Sergeant Major of the 1st Aviation Regiment, the 3rd Combat Service Support Battalion, Army School of Ordnance and the Royal Australian Army Ordnance Corps.
- Deidre May Rickards – For service to music education.
- Robert Hugh Ridge – For service to the community of Bourke.
- John Rix – For service to the community of the Riverland region.
- David George Roach – For service to the arts through contributions to amateur theatre, and to the community.
- Bryan Francis Roberts – For service to the community of Brighton, and to rural education.
- Denise Roberts – For service to the community of Bairnsdale.
- Margaret Ann Roberts – For service to the community of New South Wales, particularly women.
- William Roberts – For service to veterans.
- Eleanor Denise Robin – For service to the protection of the environment and conservation of Indigenous and cultural heritage.
- Arthur David Roffey – For service to lapidary and mineralogy.
- Alec Donald Ross – For service to tourism in central Australia.
- William Scott Ross – For service to rugby union, and to the community.
- Catherine Joyce Roth – For service to the community of Geelong.
- Jacques Maurice Rousset – For service to youth, and to the community of Perth.
- William Murry Rowlings – For service to the community through the protection of human rights and civil liberties.
- Andrea Rufo – For service to the community of the Hunter Valley.
- Flight Sergeant Matthew Mark Rush – For meritorious service in the field of Communication Information Systems.
- Anthony Sakowski – For service to the Polish community through ex-service welfare organisations.
- Gordon David Samuel – For service to the Lutheran Church through a range of administrative roles.
- William Maxwell Sauer – For service to the community of Mildura.
- Pamela Dorothy Schulz – For service to public relations, and to the community.
- Desmond Earl Schuman – For service to the community of Armidale-Dumaresq.
- Enzo Scipioni – For service to the community in the field of health.
- Dean Gordon Scott – For service to the community of Adelaide.
- Dr Ronald Dalkeith Scott – For service to the community of Boorowa as a general practitioner.
- Margaret Allison Sedgwick – For service to the community of Batlow.
- Stewart Mathew Seeney – For meritorious service as the Aviation Safety Officer at Number 81 Wing and Staff Officer Airworthiness and Capability Management at Headquarters Air Combat Group.
- Associate Professor David Emile Serisier – For service to medicine in the field of neurology.
- Deborah Susan Setterlund – For service to the Nepalese community.
- Rodney Wilfred Setterlund – For service to the Nepalese community.
- Isabelle Lynne Shapiro – For service to the community of Woollahra.
- Janice Faye Sharman – For service to the community of Glen Innes.
- Barbara Shields – For service to the community of Geraldton.
- Major Ann Elizabeth Sherren – For meritorious service as a Regimental Sergeant Major at Adelaide Logistics Battalion, a Military Support Officer at Defence Community Organisation - Darwin, and Second-in-Command of 1st Combat Signal Regiment.
- Phillip Zelma Shulman – For service to the community of Victoria through a range of multicultural, charitable and social welfare organisations.
- Maxwell Raymond Simmonds – For service to horse racing in Western Australia as a race commentator.
- Mary Elvia Slack – For service to the community of Gayndah.
- Wieslaw Antoni Slowik – For service to the Polish community of Victoria.
- Lewis Adrian Smit – For service to the livestock industry, and to the community of Kojonup.
- Lee-Anne Smith – For service to the community, particularly Indigenous youth.
- Margaret Christine Smith – For service to the community, particularly children and youth.
- Clement Smith – For service to motorsports.
- Dr Clifford Francis Smith – For service to medicine, particularly in Papua New Guinea.
- Peter Graham Smith – For service to the communities of Sherbrooke and Belgrave.
- Raymond John Southeren – For service to the community of Gosford.
- James Norman Spark – For service to aviation training.
- Gwenda Margaret Spencer – For service to the community of The Gap.
- Paul Daniel Stafford – For service to the community of Sydney as a chaplain.
- Anna Stefaniuk – For service to education through multicultural initiatives, and to the Ukrainian community.
- Peta Gwen Stilgoe – For service to dispute resolution.
- Audrey Elsie Stuart – For service to the community of the Southern Highlands.
- Andrew George Sluggett – For service to the community of Warrnambool.
- Patrick Francis Sullivan – For service to journalism, and to the community of Gundagai.
- Miriam Suss – For service to the Jewish community.
- Kay Suter – For service to adaptive rowing, and to the community.
- Kim Marie Sutherland – For service to the arts.
- Rimma Sverdlin – For service to the Jewish community.
- John Francis Swann – For service to the Catholic Church in South Australia.
- Marie-Claire Szekely – For service to the performing arts, particularly opera.
- Janet Rowena Tallon – For service to the community of Bundaberg.
- Ian Robert Taverner – For service to the community through emergency service roles.
- Julie Neale Taylor – For service to the community as a volunteer with horticultural and service organisations.
- Margaret Anne Taylor – For service to agricultural safety.
- Roel Willem Ten Cate – For service to the community of Parkes, and to local journalism.
- Albert George Thomas – For service to athletics as an athlete, administrator and promoter of charitable events, and to the community.
- Clive Neville Thomas – For service to the community of Forbes, and to conservation.
- William James Thompson – For service to the community of the Riverina.
- Robin Marilyn Timmins – For service to rugby union, and to the Liberal Party of Australia.
- Brian Maxwell Tobin – For service to veterans and their families.
- Leonard William Tozer – For service to the community of Gundagai, particularly through local government.
- Edward Richard Tudor – For service to education, and to the community.
- Bill Turner – For service to football, and to the community, particularly youth.
- Iivo Veljo Tuul – For service to the Estonian community.
- Robert Leendert Uittenbroek – For service to Australian rules football in Western Australia.
- Brian John Vickers – For service to the apple and pear industry in South Australia, and to the community.
- Dr Peter James Vine – For service to medicine, and to education.
- Margo Anne Wagner – For service to farming communities.
- Gambhir Watts – For service to multicultural relations in New South Wales.
- Edith Marilyn Webster – For service to choral music, and to the community of South Australia.
- Graham Stanley Wellings – For service to the community of White Cliffs.
- Matthew James Welsh – For service to swimming.
- Petronella Wensing – For service to the creative arts, and to the community of Canberra.
- Jean Muriel Whiley – For service to the communities of Cowra and Orange.
- Dr Brian James White – For service to medicine in the field of mental health, and to veterans and their families.
- Peter Everett White – For service to the community as a philanthropist.
- William John Whitestyles – For service to the communities of Chinchilla and Brisbane, and to youth through the Scouting movement.
- David Grenfell Whitney – For service to town planning.
- William Ronald Wilkins – For service to the community of the City of Maroondah.
- David William Williamson – For service to the communities of Terrigal and Erina.
- Keith Maxwell Williamson – For service to the community through social welfare roles.
- Kenneth Bruce Williamson – For service to gymnastics.
- Brian John Wilson – For service to the construction industry as a building surveyor.
- Leslie Wiltshire – For service to the community of Waringah.
- Vera Mary Wiltshire – For service to netball.
- Errol Thomas Wood – For service to veterans and their families.
- Jennifer Margaret Wood – For service to the community of Narbethong.
- Marlene Francis Worthington – For service to the community of Brisbane, and to people with a disability and their carers.
- Pamela Norma Wyles – For service to the community.
- Rose Wing-Sheung Yeung – For service to the Chinese community, particularly through cancer support services.
- John William Young – For service to the community of Pennant Hills.
- Richard John Young – For service to aged care, particularly in the Illawarra region.
- Lorraine Kathleen Young – For service to community health through education and support for research into meningococcal disease.
- Barry George Young – For service to community health through education and support for research into meningococcal disease.
- Viktor Zappner – For service to the arts through the introduction and promotion of jazz in north west Tasmania.

==== Military Division ====
===== Navy =====
- Commander Brian Oswald Nitschinsk RAN – For meritorious service in the field of engineering in the Royal Australian Navy.
- Warrant Officer Frederick Lindsay Campbell – For meritorious service in the field of aviation maintenance and for leadership as a Warrant Officer in HMA Ships Cerberus and Creswell.
- Warrant Officer Michael David CONNORS – For meritorious service as the Defence Administrative Assistant in Dili, East Timor, the senior Naval Police Coxswain at HMAS Cerberus and Ship's Warrant Officer in HMAS Sydney.

===== Army =====
- Major Ann Elizabeth Sherren – For meritorious service as a Regimental Sergeant Major at Adelaide Logistics Battalion, a Military Support Officer at Defence Community Organisation – Darwin, and Second-in-Command of 1st Combat Signal Regiment.
- Warrant Officer Class One David John Allen – For meritorious service as the Regimental Sergeant Major of 7th Battalion, Royal Australian Regiment; Regimental Sergeant Major, Mentoring and Reconstruction Task Force One; and Regimental Sergeant Major, Combat Training Centre.
- Warrant Officer Class One Steven John Di Tullio – For meritorious service as Regimental Sergeant Major of the 6th Engineer Support Regiment, the 2nd Combat Engineer Regiment and the School of Military Engineering.
- Warrant Officer Class One Christopher Walton Mayfield – For meritorious service as Master Gunner Proof and Experimental Establishment Graytown and as the Regimental Sergeant Major 8th/12th Regiment, Royal Australian Artillery.
- Warrant Officer Class One Paul Marcus Richardson – For meritorious service as Regimental Sergeant Major of the 1st Aviation Regiment, the 3rd Combat Service Support Battalion, Army School of Ordnance and the Royal Australian Army Ordnance Corps.

===== Air Force =====
- Group Captain Ian Andrew Nesbitt – For meritorious service in the field of Air Combat Capability support.
- Wing Commander Stephen Gareth Chappell – For meritorious service to the Royal Australian Air Force in the field of Air Combat.
- Wing Commander Stewart Mathew Seeney – For meritorious service as the Aviation Safety Officer at Number 81 Wing and Staff Officer Airworthiness and Capability Management at Headquarters Air Combat Group.
- Flight Sergeant Matthew Mark Rush – For meritorious service in the field of Communication Information Systems.

== Public Service Medal (PSM) ==
Public Service Medal ribbon

=== Australian Public Service ===
- Graham AKROYD – For outstanding public service in the defence field of weapon/missile computational and simulation development.
- Amanda Jane CATTERMOLE – For outstanding public service in leading reform of the provision of housing for Indigenous people in remote communities and the National Gambling Reform Laws.
- Ian Ross DEANE – For outstanding public service in providing legal advice and other assistance to the Department of Immigration and Citizenship.
- Helen Elaine FERGUSON – For outstanding public service as a social worker for the Department of Human Services in rural and remote communities.
- His Excellency Paul FOLEY – (Australian Ambassador to Iran) For outstanding public service to international relations as Australia's Ambassador to Afghanistan from 2010 to 2012.
- Denise HODGSON – For outstanding public service in the role of Multicultural Service Officer for the Department of Human Services within the Mid Coast NSW Zone.
- Doctor Doug Cromar KEAN – For outstanding public service in contributing to the understanding of Australia's strategic interests and the international environment.
- Patricia Margaret KELLY – For outstanding public service in leading the promotion and implementation of higher levels of innovation in the Australian Public Service and for her leadership of the Australian Government's bid to host the international Square Kilometre Array facility.
- Renée Elmina LEON – For outstanding public service to public administration and law in leadership roles in the Australian Capital Territory and the Commonwealth.
- Charles Andrew MASKELL-KNIGHT – For outstanding public service to policy across many aspects of health and Commonwealth/State relations.
- Rona Louise MELLOR – For outstanding public service in the development and implementation of bio-security, taxation and health system policies and projects.
- Lyn O'CONNELL – For outstanding public service in the development of national transport reforms.
- Nigel Richard RAY – For outstanding public service through contributing to economic policy and the Australian Government's fiscal strategy in response to the 2008 financial crisis
- Timothy Emmanuel SPITERI – For outstanding public service in support of Australia's diplomatic and military efforts in Afghanistan.
- Ann Margaret STEWARD – For outstanding public service through the development of central coordinated Information and Communications Technology programs in government as the

Australian Government Chief Information Officer and head of the Australian Government Information Management Office.

=== New South Wales Public Service ===
- Kenneth Henry CRAIG – For outstanding public service, particularly as the Northern Regional Manager of the Aboriginal Housing Office in New South Wales.
- George Wheatley GATES – For outstanding public service, particularly in the area of water management in New South Wales.
- Scott Robert GRIFFITHS – For outstanding public service, particularly as Regional Director, Western Region of Ageing, Disability and Home Care, and as Regional Executive Director, Department of Family and Community Services, in New South Wales.
- Margaret Anne HUNTER – For outstanding public service, particularly to public education in New South Wales.
- Doctor Peter John KENNEDY – For outstanding public service to the public health system in New South Wales, particularly as Deputy Chief Executive, Clinical Excellence Commission.
- Dawn Gloria KING – For outstanding public service as an Executive Officer with New South Wales Police
- Phillip Leslie RASKALL – For outstanding public service to the City of Sydney Council.
- Nicole Anne ROSE – For outstanding public service, particularly as the Director of the Office of the NSW Police Commissioner.
- James Francis WHITE – For outstanding public service to public education, particularly in the New England region of New South Wales.
- Kathryn Heather WILLIAMS – For outstanding public service in providing improved housing outcomes for disadvantaged communities, particularly in the outer suburbs of Sydney.

=== Victorian Public Service ===
- Paul Vincent BRODERICK – For outstanding public service to the Victorian community through his leadership and achievement of world class standards of efficiency and operation at the State Revenue Office.
- Antonietta CAVALLO – For outstanding public service in developing and implementing the Graduated Licensing Scheme for novice and young drivers.
- Annemarie COUSINS – For outstanding public service in the development and delivery of consumer protection policy and services to the benefit of the community, both in Victoria and nationally.
- Michael Peter EBDON – For outstanding public service to the energy industry and to the community through the development of gas, pipeline and electricity safety in Victoria.
- John James GILLESPIE – For outstanding public service to the finance and public transport portfolios through the delivery of policy and legislation services.
- Doctor John Adrian LYNCH – For outstanding service to the justice system in Victoria.
- James William NELMS – For outstanding public service to the Victorian Civil and Administrative Tribunal.
- John William SCHEFFER – For outstanding public service to the development and delivery of forensic services, particularly in the biological field.
- Andrew Rex WALL – For outstanding public service to Victoria's road network through the development of the SmartRoads program.
- Christopher WARDLAW – For outstanding public service to education, particularly in leading major change programs in the education system in Victoria.

=== Queensland Public Service ===
- Janet BORN – For outstanding public service to emergency services and community safety.
- Shirley Anne GLENNON – For outstanding public service in leadership of Queensland's Healthy Hearing programs.
- Sharan Maree HARVEY – For outstanding public service to the Brisbane City Council, particularly to the Brisbane City Council Library Service.
- Frances Margaret PAGE – For outstanding public service to Indigenous health and support programs in north west Queensland.
- Kevin John POKARIER – For outstanding public service, contributions and service excellence to internal and external clients of the Department of Natural Resources and Mines.

=== Western Australian Public Service ===
- Catherine Ann STODDART – For outstanding public service, particularly as the Chief Nurse and Midwifery Officer of Western Australia.
- Raymond Stewart TAME – For outstanding public service to the City of Armadale and to the Western Australian Local Government Association.

=== South Australian Public Service ===
- Doctor David Joseph CAUDREY – For outstanding public service to the disability sector.
- Professor Dorothy Mary KEEFE – For outstanding public service in the areas of public health, medical research and oncology.
- Gregory John PARKER – For outstanding public service in the provision of legal and industrial advice.

== Australian Police Medal (APM) ==
Australian Police Medal ribbon

=== Australian Federal Police ===
- Commander Raymond Charles JOHNSON
- Detective Superintendent Brett James McCANN

=== New South Wales Police ===
- Chief Superintendent Anthony TRICHTER
- Superintendent Mark Alan HIRON
- Superintendent David Gregory SIMMONS
- Superintendent Mark Steven WALTON
- Detective Superintendent Scott Joseph WHYTE
- Detective Chief Inspector Daniel John SHARKEY
- Detective Senior Sergeant Roslyn Ann KEYS
- Senior Constable Imants RAMMA

=== Victoria Police ===
- Assistant Commissioner Jeffrey Stephen POPE
- Superintendent Andrew Paul ALLEN
- Superintendent Graeme Dean ARTHUR
- Superintendent Philip Richard GREEN
- Sergeant John Philip HARPER
- Leading Senior Constable Ali GURDAG
- Leading Senior Constable Brett Dale TANIAN

=== Queensland Police ===
- Superintendent Robert William WAUGH
- Inspector Rolf Richard STRAATEMEIER
- Inspector Deborah Thyra NICHOLSON
- Senior Sergeant Kenneth Renald RACH OAM
- Senior Sergeant Megan Jane McARTHUR

=== Western Australian Police ===
- Superintendent Darryl Wesley GAUNT
- Superintendent Kim Douglas PORTER
- Superintendent Pryce Joseph SCANLAN
- Sergeant Susan Merryn BOJCUN

=== South Australian Police ===
- Assistant Commissioner Paul McKinlay DICKSON
- Senior Sergeant First Class Thomas Hendrikus NYENHUIS
- Detective Senior Sergeant Wayne John WILLIAMSON
- Sergeant Susan Merryn BOJCUN

=== Tasmanian Police ===
- Inspector Richard Stuart SCOTT

=== Northern Territory Police ===
- Senior Sergeant Shaun Clifford GILL

== Australian Fire Service Medal (AFSM) ==
Australian Fire Service Medal ribbon

=== New South Wales ===
- Cathryn Monica DORAHY
- Christopher Thomas FAVELLE
- Elizabeth Mary FERRIS
- Ronald HEADON
- Garry James KADWELL
- Doctor Christopher LEWIS
- Darrell William PAUL
- Keith Stanley ROBINSON
- Arthur James SHARP
- Graham Stewart TAIT
- Robert John TINKER

=== Victoria ===
- Kenneth Stewart BAXTER
- Geoffrey Bruce CONWAY
- Andrew Melville HOWLETT
- Ewan WALLER

=== Queensland ===
- James Colin BESGROVE
- Roger STUBBS

=== Western Australia ===
- Gary Wayne KENNEDY
- Keith Stanley ROBINSON

=== South Australia ===
- Frederick William STENT
- Robert Leslie ZIERSCH

=== Australian Capital Territory ===
- Stephen John GIBBS
- Richard John WOODS

=== Northern Territory ===
- Stephen John GIBBS

== Ambulance Service Medal (ASM) ==
Ambulance Service Medal ribbon

=== Queensland ===
- Richard GALEANO
- Nicholas Constantine LENTAKIS

=== South Australia ===
- Raymond Paul CREEN
- Gregory Michael JOSEPH

=== Australian Capital Territory ===
- David Shane DUTTON BM

== Emergency Services Medal (ESM) ==
Emergency Services Medal ribbon

=== New South Wales ===
- Patricia Dorothy FAYERS
- James Lindsay GLISSAN QC
- Leslie Eric MILNE
- Joan NOBLE

=== Victoria ===
- Julie Mary JOCHS
- Colin John MATHESON

=== Queensland ===
- Gregory Lawrence TURNER

=== Western Australia ===
- Joseph Anthony TAYLOR

=== South Australia ===
- Susan Dorothie GAGE
- Trevor Ross HEITMANN OAM

=== Australian Capital Territory ===
- John Bernard DOWLING

== Medal for Gallantry (MG) ==
Medal for Gallantry ribbon

=== Army ===
- Sergeant C – For acts of gallantry in action in hazardous circumstances as a team commander, Special Operations Task Group on Operation SLIPPER in Afghanistan.
- Sergeant Blaine Flower DIDDAMS – (Deceased) For acts of gallantry in action in hazardous circumstances as a patrol commander, Special Operations Task Group Rotation XVII on Operation SLIPPER in Afghanistan on 2 July 2012.

== Commendation for Gallantry ==
Commendation for Gallantry ribbon

=== Army ===
- Corporal A – For acts of gallantry in action as a deputy patrol commander, Special Operations Task Group, on Operation SLIPPER in Afghanistan.
- Private A – For acts of gallantry in action as a team member, Special Operations Task Group on Operation SLIPPER in Afghanistan.
- Corporal B – For acts of gallantry in action as a team commander, Special Operations Task Group on Operation SLIPPER in Afghanistan.
- Sapper R – For acts of gallantry in action as a special operations engineer, Special Operations Task Group on Operation SLIPPER in Afghanistan.

== Distinguished Service Cross (DSC) ==
Distinguished Service Cross ribbon

=== Army ===
- Major General Stuart Lyle SMITH AM – For distinguished command and leadership in warlike operations as Commander Joint Task Force 633 on Operation SLIPPER from January to October 2012.
- Lieutenant Colonel Kahlil Scarf FEGAN – For distinguished command and leadership in warlike operations and in action as the Commanding Officer, Mentoring Task Force 4 on Operation SLIPPER in Afghanistan from January to June 2012.
- Lieutenant Colonel J – For distinguished command and leadership in warlike operations and in action as the Commanding Officer, Special Operations Task Group on Operation SLIPPER in Afghanistan.

== Bar to the Distinguished Service Medal (DSM & Bar) ==
Distinguished Service Medal and Bar ribbon

=== Army ===
- Major M DSM – For distinguished leadership in warlike operations and in action as an officer commanding in the Special Operations Task Group on Operation SLIPPER in Afghanistan.

== Distinguished Service Medal (DSM) ==
Distinguished Service Medal ribbon

=== Army ===
- Major N – For distinguished leadership in warlike operations and in action as an officer commanding in the Special Operations Task Group on Operation SLIPPER in Afghanistan.
- Captain M – For distinguished leadership in warlike operations and in action as a platoon commander, Special Operations Task Group, on Operation SLIPPER in Afghanistan.
- Sergeant M – For distinguished leadership in warlike operations and in action as a section commander with Special Operations Task Group on Operation SLIPPER in Afghanistan.

== Commendation for Distinguished Service ==
Commendation for Distinguished Service ribbon

=== Navy ===
- Commodore Jonathan Dallas MEAD AM RAN – For distinguished performance of duty in warlike operations as the Commander Combined Task Force 150 on Operation SLIPPER in the Middle East from October 2011 to April 2012.
- Commander Richard John BOULTON RAN – For distinguished performance of duty in warlike operations as the Commanding Officer, HMAS Melbourne on Operation SLIPPER in the Middle East from February to July 2012.

=== Army ===
- Brigadier Simone Wilkie AM – For distinguished performance of duty in warlike operations as Assistant Commander – Afghanistan, Joint Task Force 633 on Operation SLIPPER from September 2011 to August 2012.
- Captain D – For distinguished performance of duty in warlike operations and in action as the Regimental Medical Officer, Special Operations Task Group, on Operation SLIPPER

in Afghanistan.

- Sergeant T – For distinguished performance of duty in warlike operations and in action as a patrol commander, Special Operations Task Group, on Operation SLIPPER in Afghanistan.
- Sergeant W – For distinguished performance of duty in warlike operations and in action as the Explosive Ordnance Disposal Technician and Mobility Survivability Commander, Special Operations Task Group, on Operation SLIPPER in Afghanistan.

=== Air Force ===
- Wing Commander Catherine Mary WILLIAMS – For distinguished performance of duty in warlike operations as Commanding Officer, Multi-National Base Tarin Kowt, on Operation SLIPPER in Afghanistan from November 2011 to July 2012.

== Conspicuous Service Cross (CSC) ==
Conspicuous Service Cross ribbon

=== Navy ===
- Commander Rachel Ann DURBIN RAN – For outstanding devotion to duty as the Royal Australian Navy Category Manager for Technical Officers and Sailors in the Directorate of Navy Category Management.
- Commander David Edward GRAHAM RAN – For outstanding devotion to duty as the Executive Officer, HMAS Creswell
- Commander Michael John STOCK RANR – For meritorious service as the Defence Administrative Assistant in Dili, East Timor, the senior Naval Police Coxswain at HMAS Cerberus and Ship's Warrant Officer in HMAS Sydney.
- Lieutenant Commander Paul John HINES RAN – For outstanding achievement as the Commanding Officer, Patrol Boat Crew ARDENT FIVE in the rescue of 273 survivors in two search and rescue operations in June and July 2012.
- Lieutenant Commander Peter Matthew SMITH RAN – For outstanding achievement as the Officer-in-Charge of the Submarine and Underwater Medicine Unit in HMAS Penguin.

=== Army ===
- Brigadier David Anthony CREAGH AM – For outstanding achievement as the Director General Logistics Assurance, Joint Logistics Command.
- Brigadier Iain Geoffrey SPENCE RFD – For outstanding achievement as the Director General Reserves – Army.
- Colonel Luke FOSTER AM CSM – For outstanding achievement as the inaugural Commander Joint Task Force 637 on Operation QUEENSLAND FLOOD ASSIST in January 2011 and as Commander Joint Task Force 631 on Operation ASTUTE in Timor Leste from June 2011 to October 2012.
- Colonel Duncan Leslie HAYWARD – For outstanding achievement as the Director International Engagement – Army.
- Colonel Michael John LEHMANN – For outstanding achievement and leadership as the Director Military Afghanistan, Defence Signals Directorate, providing intelligence support to Australian and Coalition forces in Afghanistan.
- Colonel Andrew Neil MacNAB – For outstanding achievement as Commander, Joint Combined Task Force 630 in support of the Papua New Guinea Electoral Commission on Operation CATHEDRAL from May to July 2012.
- Lieutenant Colonel Scott Andrew CORRIGAN – For outstanding achievement as the Commanding Officer of the Special Operations Engineer Regiment.
- Lieutenant Colonel Simon James HERITAGE – For outstanding achievement as the Commander Australian Contingent on Operation ASLAN in the Republic of South Sudan from October 2011 to February 2012.
- Lieutenant Colonel Scott Alexander TATNELL – For outstanding achievement as the Commanding Officer Combat Training CentreLive.
- Chaplain Catherine Margaret INCHES-OGDEN – For outstanding achievement as a chaplain in the Australian Army, in the roles of unit chaplain, training and development officer, deployed chaplain and as the Senior Chaplain to Army Headquarters.
- Major Nerida Gaye BYRNES – For outstanding devotion to duty as the Acting Commanding Officer, Joint Health Unit – North Queensland, Joint Health Command.
- Warrant Officer Class One Robert McKay FROST CSM – For outstanding achievement in the performance of duty as the Telecommunications Systems Engineer, Special Operations Headquarters.

=== Air Force ===
- Group Captain Glen Philip BECK – For outstanding achievement as Commanding Officer of Number 77 Squadron.
- Flight Lieutenant Paul Anthony GORMLEY – For outstanding achievement in the leadership, development and sustainment of the AP-3C Orion Operational Mission Simulator.
- Flight Lieutenant Trent McINTOSH – For outstanding achievement as a Logistics Officer in Aerospace Systems Division, Defence Materiel Organisation.
- Leading Aircraftman Sandy Christopher MacLEOD – For outstanding achievement in the delivery and operation of a space-based surveillance capability at Number 1 Radar Surveillance Unit.

== Conspicuous Service Medal (CSM) ==
Conspicuous Service Medal ribbon

=== Navy ===
- Commander Anita Louise SELLICK RAN – For meritorious devotion to duty as Staff Officer Navigation and Seamanship and as Commander Policy, Australian Maritime Warfare Centre.
- Commander Jennifer Anne WITTWER RAN – For meritorious devotion to duty as the Royal Australian Navy Strategic Women's Adviser.
- Lieutenant Commander Alexander Richard GIBBS RAN – For meritorious achievement as Staff Officer Grade 2 Operations in Headquarters Northern Command in support of border protection operations.
- Lieutenant Clinton Ernest WALTERS RAN – For meritorious achievement in support of Operation RESOLUTE during 2011 and 2012 while serving as the Executive Officer, Patrol Boat Crew ATTACK FOUR.
- Chief Petty Officer Craig DALY – For meritorious achievement as the Senior Technical Officer aboard HMAS Wewak
- Petty Officer Leigh Adrian KUBACKI – For meritorious devotion to duty as the Naval Police Coxswain in patrol boat crew ASSAIL ONE.

=== Army ===
- Lieutenant Colonel Mark Andrew ZAMMIT – For meritorious achievement as Commander, Air Operations Planning Team, in support of the Papua New Guinea Electoral Commission on Operation CATHEDRAL in Papua New Guinea from March to July 2012.
- Lieutenant Colonel B – For meritorious achievement in command and staff appointments within Special Operations Command over an extended period of service.
- Major Mark Drake DUNN OAM – For meritorious devotion to duty as the Staff Officer Grade Two Senior Warrant Officer Management Section, Directorate of Soldier Career Management – Army.
- Major Ryan James HOLMES – For meritorious achievement as the Staff Officer Grade Two Physical Employment Standards in Army Headquarters.
- Major Bronwyn Merle JOHNSTONE – For meritorious achievement as the Acting Staff Officer Grade One Establishments in the Directorate of Plans – Army.
- Major Jeremy Thomas MIKUS – For meritorious achievement in the planning and execution of the Army TORCH Battlespace Management System trial within 1st Brigade.
- Captain Alisa Jane WICKHAM – For meritorious devotion to duty as the Assistant Employment Category Manager for Army Health Services.
- Warrant Officer Class One Stephen Joseph FIELD – For meritorious devotion to duty as the Contract Authority Representative at Cargo Helicopter Management Unit, Army Aviation Systems Branch in support of the Army Aviation CH-47D Chinook capability.
- Warrant Officer Class Two G – For meritorious achievement while appointed Senior Instructor Strategic Strike Cell at the Special Air Service Regiment.
- Sergeant James Tunzi LONG – For meritorious achievement as a Section Commander and Platoon Sergeant Rehabilitation Platoon, 1st Battalion, Royal Australian Regiment.

=== Air Force ===
- Wing Commander Lionel George BENTLEY – For meritorious devotion to duty in support of Heron remotely piloted vehicle operations.
- Squadron Leader Michel-Louise DEVINE – For meritorious devotion to duty as the Health Centre Manager, Edinburgh Health Centre, Joint Health Unit – South Australia, Joint Health Command.
- Warrant Officer Stephen Craig EDWARDS – For meritorious achievement as the Warrant Officer Engineering at Number 4 Squadron.
- Warrant Officer Damien Peter JACKSON – For meritorious achievement as the Warrant Officer Engineering of Number 10 Squadron and as the Number 92 Wing Logistics Operations Warrant Officer.
