= Targeted lung denervation =

- Other names: TLD
- Specialty: Pulmonology

Targeted lung denervation (TLD) is a procedure, that is currently being studied, to try to improve chronic obstructive pulmonary disease (COPD). Evidence to support its use is insufficient as of 2015. TLD is intended to block airway nerves of the parasympathetic nervous system to try to relax the airways. The procedure is done using a balloon catheter through a bronchoscope and uses radio frequency energy. The bronchoscope is passed through the person's mouth and into their lungs. A dual-cooled radiofrequency ablation catheter is passed through the bronchoscope to provide the treatment.
