= Sheue-yann Cheng =

Taiwanese-American molecular geneticist

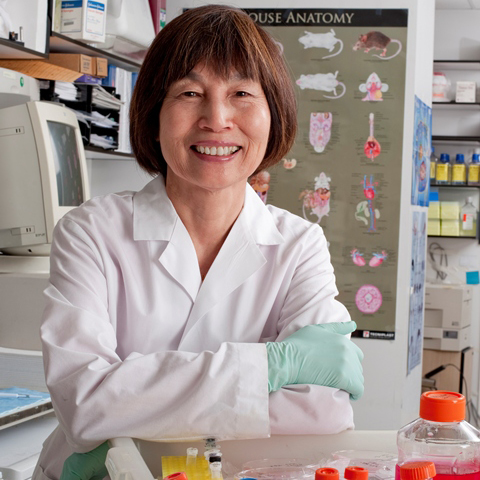
- Education: National Taiwan University (BS); University of California, San Francisco (PhD)
- Scientific career
- Fields: Molecular genetics
- Workplaces: National Cancer Institute
- Thesis: Nonclassical Steroid Analogues (1966)

Sheue-yann Cheng is a Taiwanese-American molecular geneticist who pioneered the development of mouse models to understand the molecular basis of diseases due to mutations of thyroid hormone receptors. Cheng is a senior investigator at the National Cancer Institute and chief of the gene regulation section.

== Education ==
Cheng graduated from National Taiwan University with a Bachelor of Science in 1961. She then earned her Ph.D. in pharmaceutical chemistry from the University of California, San Francisco, at the UCSF Medical Center in 1966. Her doctoral dissertation was titled, "Nonclassical steroid analogues." Cheng's dissertation committee included Manfred E. Wolff, Henry Rapoport, and Berton E. Ballard. She was a postdoctoral researcher at the University of Chicago and the National Institute of Diabetes and Digestive and Kidney Diseases.

== Career ==
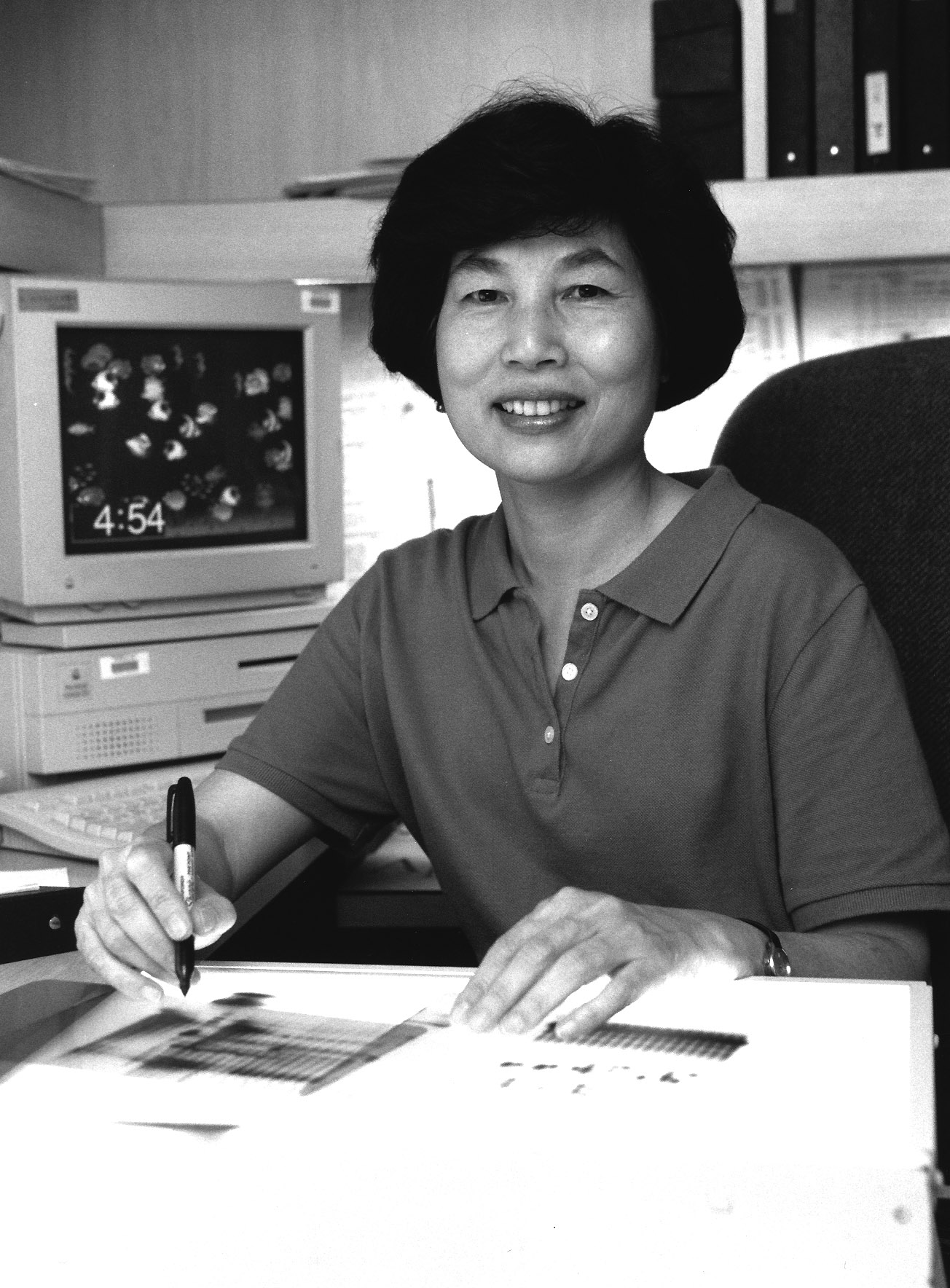
Cheng in October 1995

Cheng joined the National Cancer Institute (NCI) as a principal investigator in 1979 and was promoted to gene regulation section chief in 1991. She was promoted to the rank of senior investigator in 2016.

Cheng served as a regular member of the NIH Molecular and Cellular Endocrinology Study Session and as an advisor for Howard Hughes Medical Institute-NIH Research Scholars. She served as a women's scientist advisor of the NCI Center of Cancer Research. Currently she is an associate editor of Thyroid, associate editor-in-chief of the American Journal of Cancer Research, associate editor of Frontier-Endocrinology-Thyroid and also is on the editorial boards of several prominent journals.

=== Research ===
Cheng is recognized nationally and internationally for her work in understanding the molecular actions of mutant thyroid hormone receptors in vivo and the biology of thyroid hormone nuclear receptors in health and disease. She pioneered the development of mouse models to understand the molecular basis of diseases due to mutations of thyroid hormone receptors. Her studies of mouse models of hypothyroidism and resistance to thyroid hormone resulted in the discovery that mutations of thyroid hormone receptor subtypes lead to different human diseases. She is elucidating the roles of thyroid hormone receptors in cancers. Cheng developed preclinical mouse models of metastatic follicular thyroid cancer and anaplastic thyroid cancer. She focuses on the elucidation of altered signaling pathways to understand the molecular genetics underlying thyroid carcinogenesis. She identified molecular targets for potential treatment of thyroid cancer.

== Awards and honors ==
Cheng was awarded the NIH Merit Award for outstanding achievements, the Scientific Achievement Award from the Chinese Medical and Health Association, the Charles Harkin Award of the NCI, the Sidney H. Ingbar Distinguished Lectureship Award of the American Thyroid Association, and the Abbott Thyroid Research Clinical Fellowship Mentor Award of the Endocrine Society. She is a recipient of John B. Stanbury Thyroid Pathophysiological Medal of the American Thyroid Association.
