= Claudia Cream =

Australian lawyer and community advocate

Claudia Cream OAM
- Cream in 2025
- Born: British Hong Kong
- Education: University of Adelaide (LLB; BA)
- Occupations: Community advocate; lawyer
- Known for: First Asian woman to be graduated in law in South Australia
- Spouse: William Cream

Claudia Cream is an Australian lawyer and community advocate who became the first Asian woman to graduate in law in South Australia.

Raised in British Hong Kong, Cream moved to Australia after marrying an Australian seaman. She studied law at the University of Adelaide, graduating with a Bachelor of Laws in 1981, followed by a Bachelor of Arts and Diploma of Education in the following year. During her law studies, she was a fellow student of Jay Weatherill and Chris Kourakis.

Cream started her own legal firm, Claudia Cream and Co., because she could not find work. She was accepted by the Supreme Court of South Australia in the early 1980s, becoming the state's only Chinese lawyer. Following this, she served as the president of the Overseas Chinese Association from 1984 to 1985. Cream co-founded the Chinese Chamber of Commerce of South Australia in 1989, and later founded the Australia Asia Chamber of Commerce and Industry in 1996. In 2013, she was appointed a Member of the Order of Australia for her service to the Chinese community in South Australia.

== Early life and education ==
Claudia Cream grew up in British Hong Kong. She recalled her childhood as being very insecure as her parents put her under the supervision of different family members. Captain William Everard Seymore Cream, an Australian seaman whom she met at a telephone booth in Hong Kong during the early 1970s. The two communicated for about three years before getting married in Australia. Claudia was 17 years old at the time of her relocation to Australia.

After William made a promise to send her to university, he made her enrol in a law degree instead of teaching. She eventually studied alongside Jay Weatherill and Chris Kourakis. Following this, Cream graduated with a Bachelor of Laws from the University of Adelaide in 1981, making her the first Asian woman to graduate in law in South Australia. Afterwards, Cream obtained an additional Bachelor of Arts degree and a Diploma of Education in 1982.

== Career ==
After graduating in law, Cream was unable to secure a job despite applying for more than 200 positions. She decided to start her own law practice, Claudia Cream and Co., where she worked as a solicitor, barrister and notary public. Her practice formed an interest on migration and business law in light of the increasing Asian migration at the time. Cream also gave legal advice to migrants, refugees and members of the Chinese Australian community.

In the early 1980s, Cream became a member of the Supreme Court Bar of South Australia. At a time when she was the only Chinese lawyer practising in South Australia. She served as president of the Overseas Chinese Association (OCA) from 1984 to 1985. In 1989, she co-founded the Chinese Chamber of Commerce of South Australia.

Cream was a member of the Law Society of South Australia's Alternative Dispute Resolution Committee from 1994 to 2000. In 1996, she founded the Australia Asia Chamber of Commerce and Industry. That year, she was the adviser to three South Australian organisations composed primarily of ethnic Chinese refugees. To Prime Minister John Howard, she expressed concerns about Pauline Hanson's racial vilification statements. The letters she wrote were part of a larger response from both Chinese.

Between 1997 and 2000, Cream served a board member in the South Australia Multicultural and Ethnic Affairs Commission and the Australia Day Council of South Australia. Since 2007, she was a member of the International Women's Day Committee. Subsequently, since 2009, she has held membership in the PandaMania fundraising committee and the Multicultural Council of South Australia. From 2009 to 2012, and the National Council of Women of South Australia. In 2012, she was appointed to the Ministerial Advisory Group on Volunteering. In 2015, she was elected into the Migration Museum Foundation's committee.

Cream became involved with Australian veterans' organisations from about 2001. She joined the Partners of Veterans' Association in 2005 and became its ambassador in 2010. She has also been associated with Legacy and the War Widows' Guild of Australia. By 2018, she was president of the War Widows' Guild of Australia (South Australia), having subsequently served as a committee member.

As of 2025, Cream serves as honorary legal adviser to Chinatown in Adelaide.

== Honours and awards ==
In 2008, Cream was inducted to the South Australian Women's Honour Roll in 2008. Later, she was recognised by the OCA for her community involvement with an Outstanding Individual Achievement Award at the 2009 Governor's Multicultural Awards. Cream received the 2011 Partners of Veterans' Association Silent Achiever Award. In recognition of her contributions to the South Australian Chinese community, she was appointed a Medal of the Order of Australia (OAM) in the 2013 Queen's Birthday Honours. Alongside other Chinese Australians recognised for their professions, Cream was depicted in scene 18 of the National Museum of Australia's Harvest of Endurance scroll.

== Personal life ==
Their marriage spanned a period of 30 years. She took care of William for five years after he had a stroke. Peter Goers is an old friend of Cream, and they went to Shanghai for the Port Adelaide and Gold Coast AFL game in 2017.
