= Nikolai Bogduk =

Australian physician, anatomist and pain researcher

AM Nikolai Bogduk
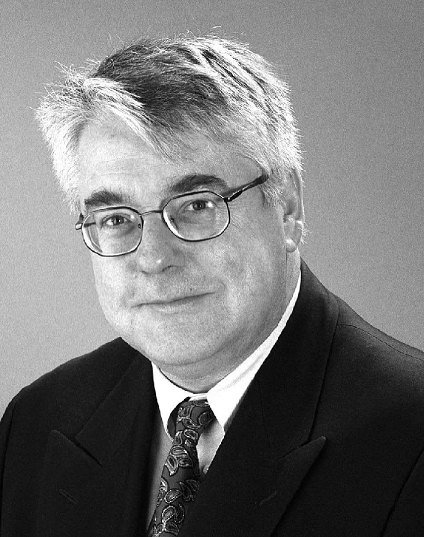
- Occupation: Physician

Academic background
- Education: Sc, MB BS, MD, PhD, DSc

Academic work
- Discipline: Musculoskeletal Medicine, Pain Medicine

Nikolai Bogduk AM is a retired Australian anatomist, and emeritus professor of the University of Newcastle Bone & Joint Institute, Australia. His research and publications were primarily on the anatomical sources and causes of chronic spinal pain and headache, as well as the development of new diagnostic techniques and treatments for these conditions. He has made significant contributions to the field of spinal anatomy, biomechanics, as well as spinal pain diagnosis and management.

== Contributions ==
Bogduk's research focused particularly on the causes and management of spinal pain. He has authored numerous books, book chapters, and peer-reviewed articles in these areas, and his work is widely cited in the fields of pain medicine, orthopedics, and physical therapy. Some key contributions include:

1. The anatomical basis of spinal pain: Bogduk developed a comprehensive classification system for spinal pain based on the anatomical structures involved. This system has been widely adopted by healthcare professionals to help diagnose and treat various types of spinal pain. His work demonstrated the importance of accurately identifying the pain source in order to provide effective treatment.
2. Facet joint pain: Bogduk was among the first to recognize the role of facet joints as a source of spinal pain and contributed to the literature in anatomy, biomechanics, diagnosis, and therapeutics. He developed diagnostic and therapeutic techniques for facet joint pain, namely medial branch blocks and radiofrequency neurotomy.
3. Whiplash-associated disorders: Bogduk conducted extensive research on the biomechanics of whiplash injuries and their association with neck pain. His work has helped to improve the understanding and management of whiplash-associated disorders.
4. Lumbar disc pain: Bogduk's research into intervertebral discs included pioneering research on the role of lumbar disc stimulation in the diagnosis of lumbar disc pain.

=== Books ===
- Clinical and Radiological Anatomy of the Lumbar Spine. N Bogduk (Author), 5th ed., Churchill Livingstone. 2012. ISBN 978-0702043420
- Management of Acute and Chronic Neck Pain. N Bogduk, B McGuirk (Authors), 1st ed., Elsevier. 2006. ISBN 978-0444508461
- Biomechanics of Back Pain. M Adams, N Bogduk, K Burton, P Dolan (Authors), 3rd ed., Churchill Livingstone. 2012. ISBN 978-0702043130
- Medical Management of Acute and Chronic Low Back Pain. An Evidence-Based Approach. N Bogduk, B McGuirk (Authors), 1st ed., Elsevier. 2002. ISBN 978-0444508454
- Medical Management of Acute Lumbar Radicular Pain: An Evidence-Based Approach. N Bogduk, J Govind (Authors), 1st ed., Newcastle Bone and Joint Institute. 1999. ISBN 0957753705
- Medical Management of Acute Cervical Radicular Pain: An Evidence-Based Approach. N Bogduk (Author), 1st ed., Newcastle Bone and Joint Institute. 1999. ISBN 0957753713

He has also published over 100 chapters to books on spinal pain and headache.

=== Edited ===
- Practice Guidelines for Spinal Diagnostic & Treatment Procedures. 2nd ed., Spine Intervention Society. 2014. ISBN 978-0988196216
- Encyclopedia of Pain. 2nd ed., Springer. 2013. ISBN 978-3-642-28754-1 (section editor)
- Classification of Chronic Pain. N Bogduk, H Merskey (Editors), 2nd ed (revised), IASP. 1994, 2011, 2012. ISBN 9780931092053
- Pain Medicine Journal, Interventional Pain & Spine Medicine Section (section editor).

=== Research papers ===
Bogduk has published anatomical research, randomised controlled trials, observational studies, and reviews. The main themes of his published research were determining the innervation of the spinal column, examining the biomechanics of the spine, the development of diagnostic tests for neck and low back pain, and developing and looking at minimally invasive treatment techniques such as radiofrequency neurotomy.

== Awards ==
- Volvo Award for Back Pain Research (1987)
- Distinguished Member Award, Australian Pain Society, (2008)
- Member of the Order of Australia (2013) - For significant service to medical research and education, particularly in the specialties of anatomy, spinal health and chronic pain management.
- SIS Aprill Lifetime Achievement Award (2017)
- Research Prize of the Cervical Spine Research Society
- Award for Outstanding Research of the North American Spine Society
- Research Prize of the Spine Society of Australia, three times.
- Excellence in Teaching, University of Newcastle

The Spine Intervention society also present a grant called the "Nikolai Bogduk Young Investigator Grant."

== See also ==
- Back pain
- Facet syndrome
- Lumbar disc disease
- Whiplash (medicine)
- Radiofrequency ablation
- Dorsal ramus of spinal nerve
