= Angus Lane =

Australian ring announcer

Angus Thomas Lane OAM is an Australian ring announcer.

Lane has been the ring announcer at many major agricultural shows in Australia including the Royal Queensland Show (more commonly known as "The Ekka"), Sydney Royal Easter Show, Perth Royal Show, Royal Darwin Show and the Royal Toowoomba Show.

He has also served as a ring announcer at many smaller agricultural shows across Queensland, commencing his career at the Jandowae Show.

After working as the ring announcer at Rockhampton's Beef Australia in 1991, Lane became the Chief Ring Announcer at The Ekka in 1992. He served in that role until 2008 before stepping down from the position for a number of years before returning in 2014.

== Recognition ==
Lane was named as Queensland Father of the Year in 2002.

In 2012, Lane was awarded the Friendship and Fellowship Award from the Queensland Chamber of Agricultural Society.

Lane received the Minister's Recognition of Outstanding Contribution to Rural Communities for Services to rural and regional Queensland from Henry Palaszczuk.

Lane was named in the 2013 Queen's Birthday Honours and awarded a Medal of the Order of Australia in recognition of his services to agricultural shows.

On Queensland Day in 2020, Lane was named as a Queensland Great for his services as an announcer and to agriculture.
