= Siri Kannangara =

Australian sports medical doctor (1944–2024)

Siri Kannangara AM
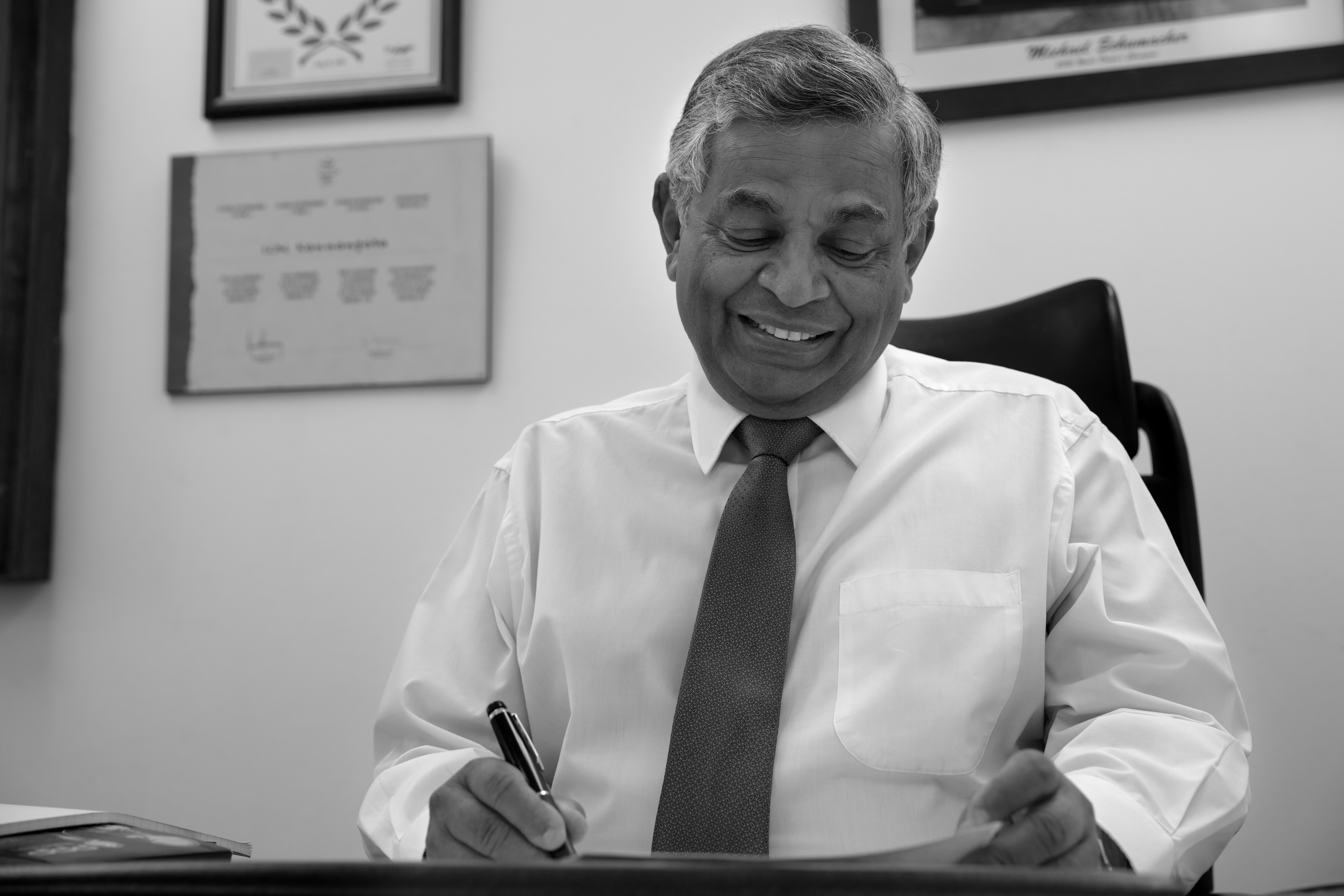
- Born: 28 October 1944; Bandaragama, Ceylon
- Died: 7 June 2024 (aged 79); Sydney, Australia
- Occupations: Sports medical doctor, trainer, sports medicine specialist and rheumatologist
- Known for: Specialised in sports medicine

Siri Kannangara (28 October 1944 – 7 June 2024) was a Sri Lankan-born Australian sports medical doctor, trainer, sports medicine specialist and rheumatologist. He was known for assisting the Sri Lankan diaspora community living in Australia for over four decades with his medical expertise.

== Early life and education ==
Kannangara hailed from a village in Bandaragama. He initially pursued his studies at Bandaragama Rambukkara Vidyartha Vidyalaya.

He pursued his primary and secondary education at Royal College in Colombo. He excelled in numerous sports, including table tennis, basketball, and field hockey, when he was studying at Royal College. He entered medical college in 1964 and continued to be engaged in multiple sporting activities, including table tennis, basketball, and field hockey, at the University of Ceylon. He also went onto take the leadership role during his academic career by captaining the Combined Universities team for both field hockey and table tennis during a mercantile invitational tournament which was held in India. He successfully completed his MBBS at the University of Colombo in 1970. Immediately after he became qualified as a doctor in 1971, he received a lucrative employment opportunity in New Zealand at a teaching hospital at Christchurch.

He met an All Blacks rugby union player who also served as a physician at Guy's Hospital in London. The player then invited Kannangara for a job offer to take up the role of senior registrar. He also received a scholarship to New Zealand where he completed further medical training in sports medicine.

== Career ==
In October 1977, he was appointed the doctor to Kerry Packer's World Series Cricket involving powerhouses Australia and the West Indies. During the 1977 World Series Cricket, he notably offered medical treatment and consultancy to leading cricketers at the time, including Viv Richards, Barry Richards and Clive Lloyd. He also became a Fellow of the Royal Australasian College of Physicians (FRACP) as well as a Fellow of the Australian College of Sports Physicians (FACSP). He was also appointed the Clinical Associate Professor of Medicine at the University of Sydney. During his career, he also trained several aspiring medical students as well as young doctors, offering consultancy and mentorship whenever necessary. He had also notably provided consultancy services and guidance related to medical issues for Sri Lankan sportspeople prior to their participation at certain international sporting events in Australia. He provided medical support at various soccer, cricket, netball, and field hockey events. He was also appointed the designated physician to Australian Olympic contingents during the 1992, 1996 and 2000 Summer Olympics. He was also invited by the International Olympic Committee to join the torch relay during the opening ceremony of the 2000 Summer Olympics, which was staged in Sydney.

He was appointed the first Australian Medical Officer by FIFA for its Medical Committee, and his role was aimed at providing insight and analysis on medical matters and issues pertaining to visiting Asian and Oceanian countries by teaching them various aspects of sports medicine. He served in as a FIFA Medical committee member for a seven-year period from 1999 to 2006. He was officially inducted to the Football Australia Hall of Fame in 2002 in recognition for his outstanding services towards medical field. He was conferred with a Member (AM) in the General Division of the Order of Australia during the 2013 Queen's Birthday Honours highlighting his significant contributions to medicine, particularly in the field of sports medicine and rheumatology.

He was engaged with Sri Lankan cricketers, especially whenever the Sri Lankan men's national cricket team traveled to Australia to play against Australia in an international bilateral series and he also often shared the dressing room with the Sri Lankan cricket team members whenever Sri Lanka toured Australia for international series. He also gave medical consultation and medical guidance to some of the Sri Lankan cricketers, including former World Cup-winning captain Arjuna Ranatunga and fast bowlers Chaminda Vaas and Lasith Malinga. He also treated Sri Lankans who were not athletes. It was also revealed that some Sri Lankan cricketers, including Sanath Jayasuriya, Muttiah Muralitharan, Ravindra Pushpakumara, Nuwan Zoysa, Arjuna Ranatunga, and Chaminda Vaas, insisted on bringing Siri Kannangara on board as part of the Sri Lankan medical support staff prior to the start of the 1999 Cricket World Cup in England, but Kannangara turned down the offer due to potential scheduling difficulties involving his duties at a teaching hospital in Sydney. He provided medical guidance to former Indian cricketer Sachin Tendulkar to help him overcome the challenges with regards to handling career threatening medical injuries which Tendulkar sustained during his 24-year long international career. During his tenure as the director of the New South Wales Institute of Sports Medicine, he was at the forefront of analyzing Muttiah Muralitharan's bowling action as part of the University of South Australia case study to determine whether Muralitharan's bowling action was genuinely legitimate or if he was chucking the ball in his bowling runup when delivering the ball in his follow-through at the international level.

== Later life ==
Kannangara was married and had three children.

After migrating to Australia in 1977, he lived there for the rest of his life and died in Sydney on 7 June 2024.
