= Radiofrequency ablation =

Interventional procedure

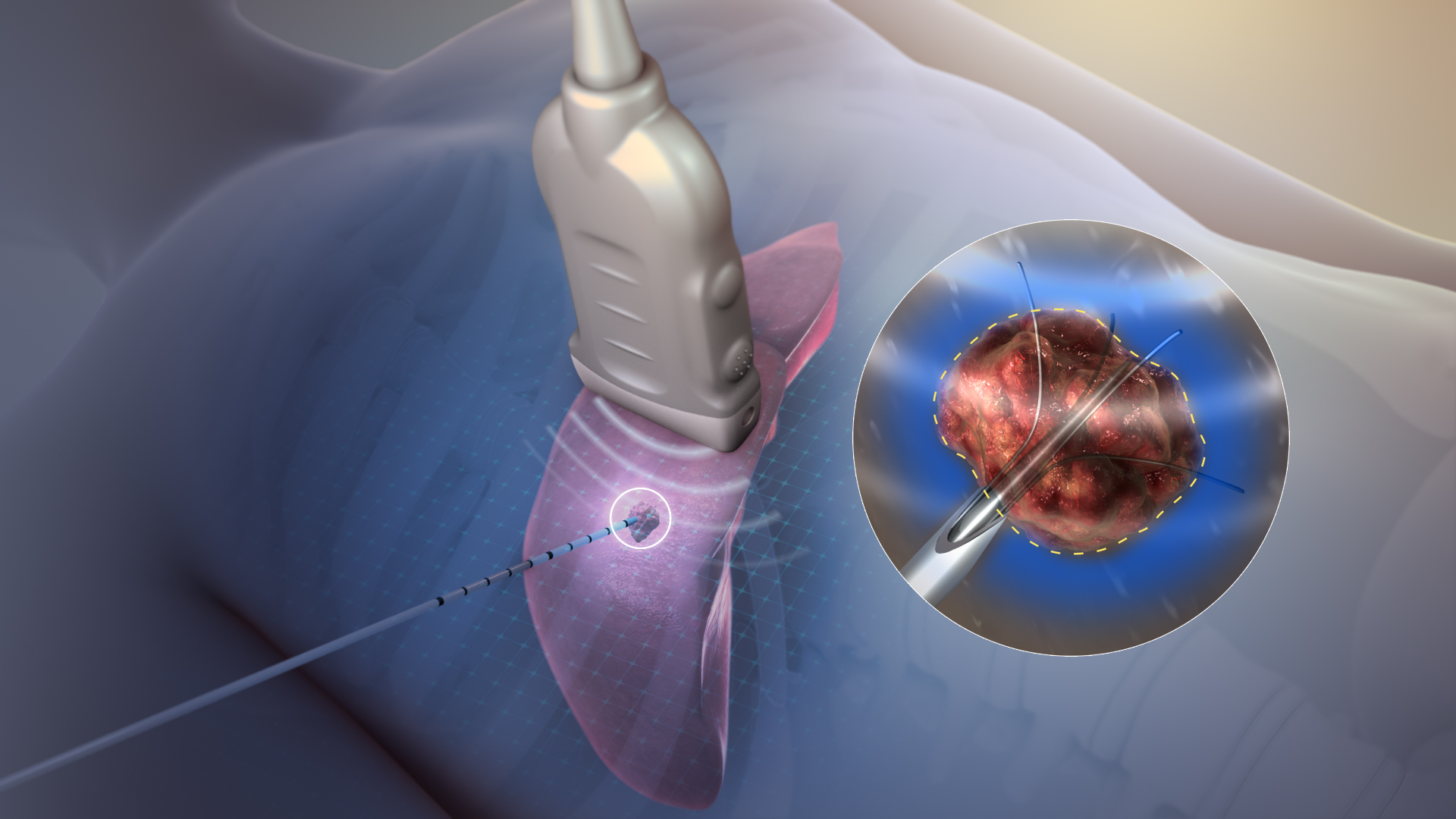
- Tissue ablation using radiofrequency.
- Specialty: Interventional radiology
- ICD-9-CM: 01.32, 04.2, 37.33, 37.34, 60.97
- MeSH: D017115

Radiofrequency ablation (RFA) is a medical procedure in which heat generated from medium frequency alternating current (in the range of 350 KHz–1 MHz) is used to selectively destroy dysfunctional tissue such as malfunctioning parts in the electrical conduction system of the heart, tumors, and sensory nerves. RFA is generally conducted in the outpatient setting, using either a local anesthetic or twilight anesthesia. When it is delivered via catheter, it is called radiofrequency catheter ablation. RFA also forms the basis behind electrosurgery.

Two advantages of medium frequency current (over previously used low frequency AC or pulses of DC) are that it does not directly stimulate nerves or heart muscle, and therefore can often be used without the need for general anesthesia, and that it is specific for treating the desired tissue without significant collateral damage. Due to this, RFA is an alternative for eligible patients who have comorbidities or do not want to undergo surgery.

Documented benefits have led to RFA becoming widely used during the 21st century. RFA procedures are performed under image guidance (such as X-ray screening, CT scan or ultrasound) by an interventional pain specialist (such as an anesthesiologist), interventional radiologist, otolaryngologists, a gastrointestinal or surgical endoscopist, or a cardiac electrophysiologist, a subspecialty of cardiologists.

== Tumors ==
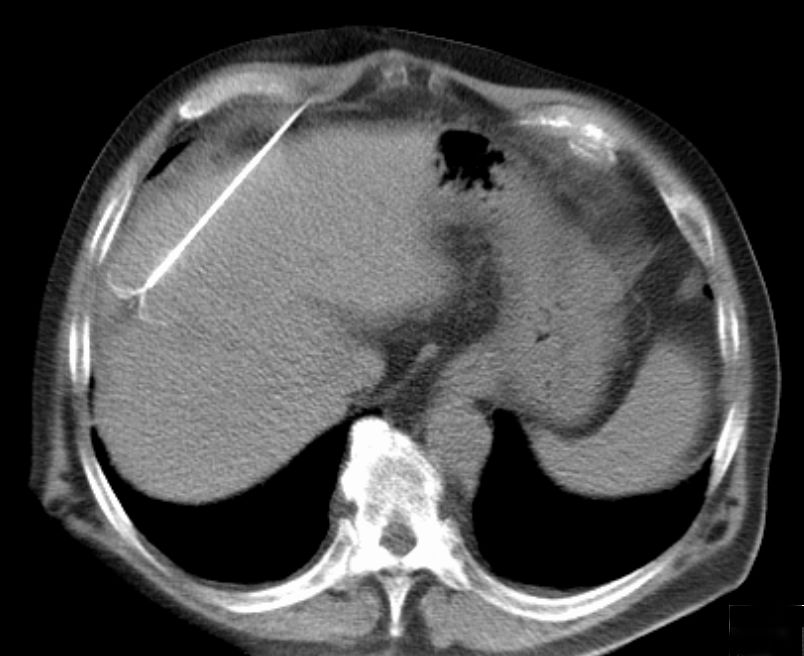
CT scan showing radiofrequency ablation of a liver lesion

RFA may be performed to treat tumors in the lung, liver, kidney, and bone, as well as other body organs less commonly. Once the diagnosis of tumor is confirmed, a needle-like RFA probe is placed inside the tumor. The radiofrequency waves passing through the probe increase the temperature within tumor tissue, which results in destruction of the tumor. RFA can be used with small tumors, whether these arose within the organ (primary tumors) or spread to the organ (metastases). The suitability of RFA for a particular tumor depends on multiple factors.

RFA can usually be administered as an outpatient procedure, though may at times require a brief hospital stay. RFA may be combined with locally delivered chemotherapy to treat hepatocellular carcinoma (primary liver cancer). Phase III trials have tried using the low-level heat (hyperthermia) created by the RFA probe to trigger release of concentrated chemotherapeutic drugs from heat-sensitive liposomes in the margins around the ablated tissue as a treatment for hepatocellular carcinoma (HCC). Radiofrequency ablation is also used in pancreatic cancer and bile duct cancer.

RFA has become increasingly important in the care of benign bone tumors, most notably osteoid osteomas. Since the procedure was first introduced for the treatment of osteoid osteomas in the 1990s, it has been shown in numerous studies to be less invasive and expensive, to result in less bone destruction and to have equivalent safety and efficacy to surgical techniques, with 66 to 95% of people reporting freedom from symptoms. While initial success rates with RFA are high, symptom recurrence after RFA treatment has been reported, with some studies demonstrating a recurrence rate similar to that of surgical treatment. RFA is also increasingly used in the palliative treatment of painful metastatic bone disease in people who are not eligible or do not respond to traditional therapies ( i.e. radiation therapy, chemotherapy, palliative surgery, bisphosphonates or analgesic medications).

== Cardiology ==
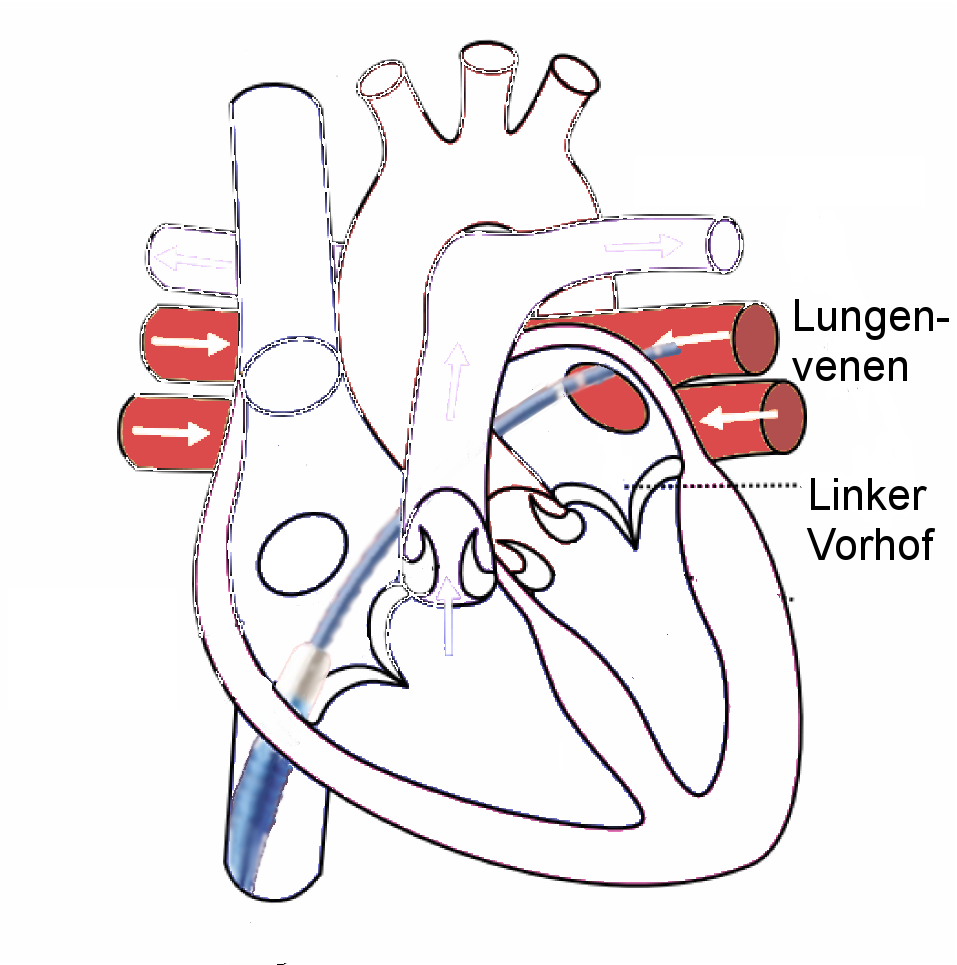
Schematic view of a pulmonary vein ablation. The catheter reaches (from below) through the inferior vena cava, the right atrium and the left atrium, to the orifice of the left upper pulmonary vein.

Radiofrequency energy is used in heart tissue or normal parts to destroy abnormal electrical pathways that are contributing to a cardiac arrhythmia. It is used in recurrent atrial flutter (Afl), atrial fibrillation (AF), supraventricular tachycardia (SVT), atrial tachycardia, Multifocal Atrial Tachycardia (MAT) and some types of ventricular arrhythmia. The energy-emitting probe (electrode) is at the tip of a catheter which is placed into the heart, usually through a vein. This catheter is called the ablator. The practitioner first "maps" an area of the heart to locate the abnormal electrical activity (electrophysiology study) before the responsible tissue is eliminated. Radiofrequency ablation technique can be used in AF, either to block the atrioventricular node after implantation of a pacemaker or to block conduction within the left atrium, especially around the pulmonary veins. Radiofrequency ablation for AF can be unipolar (one electrode) or bipolar (two electrodes). Although bipolar can be more successful, it is technically more difficult, resulting in unipolar being used more often. But bipolar is more effective in preventing recurrent atrial arrhythmias.

Ablation is now the standard treatment for SVT and typical atrial flutter. In some conditions, especially forms of intra-nodal re-entry (the most common type of SVT), also called atrioventricular nodal reentrant tachycardia or AVNRT, ablation can also be accomplished by cryoablation (tissue freezing using a coolant which flows through the catheter); this avoids the risk of complete heart block, a potential complication of radiofrequency ablation in this condition. Recurrence rates with cryoablation are higher though. Microwave ablation, where tissue is ablated by the microwave energy "cooking" the adjacent tissue, and ultrasonic ablation, creating a heating effect by mechanical vibration, and laser ablation have also been developed but are not in widespread use.

=== Renal sympathetic denervation ===
A new indication for the use of radiofrequency technology has made news in the last few years. Hypertension is a very common condition, with about 1 billion people over the world, nearly 75 million in the US alone. Complications of inadequately controlled hypertension are many and have both individual and global impact. Treatment options include medications, diet, exercise, weight reduction and meditation. Inhibition of the neural impulses that are believed to cause or worsen hypertension has been tried for a few decades. Surgical sympathectomy has helped but not without significant side effects. Therefore, the introduction of non-surgical means of renal denervation using a radiofrequency ablation catheter was enthusiastically welcomed. Although the initial use of radiofrequency-generated heat to ablate nerve endings in the renal arteries to aid in management of 'resistant hypertension' were encouraging, the most recent phase 3 studying looking at catheter-based renal denervation for the treatment of resistant hypertension failed to show any significant reduction in systolic blood pressure.

== Aesthetics dermatology ==
Radiofrequency ablation is also used in dermatosurgical applications in the form of electrosurgery. Depending on the output waveform used, different modes of ablation can be achieved, including are electrosection (cutting), electrocoagulation, electrodesiccation and fulguration. The use of radiofrequency ablation has obtained importance as it can be used to treat most of the skin lesions with minimal side effects and complications.

== Varicose veins ==
Radiofrequency ablation is a minimally invasive procedure used in the treatment of varicose veins. It is an alternative to the traditional stripping operation. Under ultrasound guidance, a radiofrequency catheter is inserted into the abnormal vein and the vessel treated with radio-energy, resulting in closure of the involved vein. Radiofrequency ablation is used to treat the great saphenous vein, the small saphenous vein, and the perforator veins. The latter are connecting veins that transport blood from the superficial veins to the deep veins. Branch varicose veins are then usually treated with other minimally invasive procedures, such as ambulatory phlebectomy, sclerotherapy, or foam sclerotherapy. Currently, the VNUS ClosureRFS stylet is the only device specifically cleared by FDA for endovenous ablation of perforator veins.

The possibility of skin burn during the procedure is very small, because the large volumes (500 cc) of dilute Lidocaine (0.1%) tumescent anesthesia injected along the entire vein prior to the application of radiofrequency provide a heat sink that absorbs the heat created by the device. Early studies have shown a high success rate with low rates of complications.

== Obstructive sleep apnea ==
RFA was first studied in obstructive sleep apnea (OSA) in a pig model. RFA has been recognized as a somnoplasty treatment option in selected situations by the American Academy of Otolaryngology but was not endorsed for general use in the American College of Physicians guidelines.

The clinical application of RFA in obstructive sleep apnea is reviewed in that main article, including controversies and potential advantages in selected medical situations. Unlike other electrosurgical devices, RFA allows very specific treatment targeting of the desired tissue with a precise line of demarcation that avoids collateral damage, which is crucial in the head and neck region due to its high density of major nerves and blood vessels. RFA also does not require high temperatures. However, overheating from misapplication of RFA can cause harmful effects such as coagulation on the surface of the electrode, boiling within tissue that can leave "a gaping hole", tears, or even charring.

== Pain management ==
=== Back ===
RFA, or rhizotomy, was developed by Nikolai Bogduk to treat chronic pain arising from the facet joints in the lower (lumbar) back. Radiofrequency waves are used to produce heat on specifically identified nerves surrounding the facet joints called the lumbar medial branches of the dorsal ramus of the spinal nerves. By generating heat around the nerve, the nerve is ablated, thus destroying its ability to transmit signals to the brain.

The nerves to be ablated are identified through injections of local anesthesia (such as lidocaine) around the medial branches prior to the RFA procedure to first confirm the diagnosis. If the local anesthesia injections provide temporary pain relief, the injection is repeated a second time to confirm the diagnosis. Then RFA is performed on the nerve(s) that responded well to the injections.

RFA is a minimally invasive procedure which can usually be done in day-surgery clinics, going home shortly after completion of the procedure. The person is awake during the procedure, so risks associated with general anesthesia are avoided. Whether for back or knee pain, a drawback for this procedure is that nerves recover function over time, so the pain relief achieved lasts only temporarily (3–15 months) in most people.

=== Knees ===
Radiofrequency ablation of sensory nerves in the knee, also called genicular neurotomy or genicular RFA, is clinically preceded by confirming pain reduction upon anesthetizing the main knee sensory nerves in a test procedure called genicular nerve block. Genicular nerve block is a short (10–30 minutes), outpatient procedure usually performed weeks before genicular RFA. The extent of pain reduction by injecting a local anesthetic, such as bupivacaine, at specific locations of the target genicular nerves, is self-assessed by the person for hours after the procedure, leading to confirmation with the physician of the need for RFA.

In the procedure for genicular RFA, a guide cannula is first directed under local anesthesia and imaging (ultrasound or fluoroscopy) to each target genicular nerve, then the radiofrequency electrode is passed through the cannula, and the electrode tip is heated to about 80 °C (176 °F) for one minute to cauterize a small segment of the nerve. The heat destroys that segment of the nerve, which is prevented from sending pain signals to the brain.

As of 2019, several hundred publications showed promise for substantial, long-term (6 months or longer) reduction of knee pain following genicular RFA. However, a 2025 meta-analysis concluded that "the use of RFA and related minimally invasive interventions for knee osteoarthritis is currently not supported by high-quality evidence. Despite some short-term reductions in pain reported with RFA compared to sham and other comparators, the overall benefits were inconsistent and minimal".

The US Food and Drug Administration had approved in 2017 a commercial device using cooled RFA, with effects lasting for up to a year of pain relief from knee arthritis. As of 2023, reviews of clinical outcomes indicated that efficacy for reducing knee pain was achieved by ablating three or more branches of the genicular nerve (one of the articular branches of the tibial nerve). Other sources indicate 4-5 genicular nerve targets may be justified for ablation to optimize pain relief, while a 2022 analysis indicated that as many as 10 genicular nerve targets for RFA would produce better long-term relief of knee pain.

Knee pain relief of 50% or more following genicular RFA may last from several months to two years, and can be repeated by the same outpatient procedure when pain recurs. In contrast, a 2025 review indicated that there was insufficient evidence for benefit of RFA 24-48 weeks after the procedure on various knee nerves, with no functional improvements at any time point.

An anatomical study of cadaver knees indicated that ultrasound-guided bony landmarks could be used to effectively target the superior medial geniculate nerve, superior lateral geniculate nerve, and inferior medial geniculate nerve – the three nerves commonly targeted for knee RFA – with average nerve-to-needle distances of 1.7, 3.2, and 1.8 mm, respectively.

== Barrett's esophagus ==
Radiofrequency ablation has been shown to be a safe and effective treatment for Barrett's esophagus. The balloon-based radiofrequency procedure was invented by Robert A. Ganz, Roger Stern and Brian Zelickson in 1999 (System and Method for Treating Abnormal Tissue in the Human Esophagus). While the person is sedated, a catheter is inserted into the esophagus and radiofrequency energy is delivered to the diseased tissue. This outpatient procedure typically lasts from fifteen to thirty minutes. Two months after the procedure, the physician performs an upper endoscopic examination to assess the esophagus for residual Barrett's esophagus. If any Barrett's esophagus is found, the disease can be treated with a focal RFA device. Between 80 and 90% or greater of people in numerous clinical trials have shown complete eradication of Barrett's esophagus in approximately two to three treatments with a favorable safety profile. The treatment of Barrett's esophagus by RFA is durable for up to 5 years.

== Thyroid nodules ==
Radiofrequency ablation has been used successfully on benign thyroid nodules for decades, most notably in Europe, South America and Korea. In the United States, the FDA approved the use of RFA techniques for thyroid nodules in 2018. Since then, professional guidelines reflect its use as a viable treatment modality for thyroid nodules, and the procedure is increasingly applied.

=== Timeline in the United States ===
- 2023: the American Thyroid Association issued the position statement "Thyroid ablative procedures provide valid alternative treatment strategies to conventional surgical management for a subset of patients with symptomatic benign thyroid nodules.

- 2022: the American Association of Clinical Endocrinologists published an update in Endocrine Practice, stating that the "new image-guided minimally invasive approaches appear safe and effective alternatives when used appropriately and by trained professionals to treat symptomatic or enlarging thyroid masses".

- 2018: FDA approved the RFA procedure for treatment of benign thyroid nodules.

=== Procedure ===
The procedure is similar to a thyroid biopsy, although instead of using a needle to remove cells from the nodule, a probe delivers heat to the interior of the nodule that effectively cauterizes the tissue. Over the course of 3–6 months, the nodule will continue to shrink, typically achieving a 50-80% reduction total size.

In order to qualify for an RFA procedure, a person must have a clearly benign thyroid nodule, usually proven by two fine needle aspiration biopsies.

As of 2020, RFA is not recommended for the treatment of malignant thyroid nodules, although research into this topic is ongoing.

== Other uses ==
RFA is also used in radiofrequency lesioning for vein closure in areas where intrusive surgery is contraindicated by trauma, and in liver resection to control bleeding (hemostasis) and facilitate the transection process.

This process has also been used to treat TRAP sequence in multiple gestation pregnancies. This has an acceptable success rate for saving the 'pump' twin in recent studies compared to previous methods including laser photocoagulation.

RFA is used to treat uterine fibroids using the heat energy of radio frequency waves to ablate the fibroid tissue. The Acessa device obtained FDA approval in 2012. The device is inserted via a laparoscopic probe and guided inside the fibroid tissue using an ultrasound probe. The heat shrinks the fibroids. Clinical data on the procedure show an average of 45% shrinkage.

RFA is also used in the treatment of Morton's neuroma where the outcome appears to be more reliable than alcohol injections.

== See also ==
- Interventional radiology
- Radio frequency
- Heart arrhythmia
