= Thyroid (journal) =

Thyroid®
- Discipline: Endocrinology
- Language: English
- Edited by: Electron Kebebew, MD

Publication details
- History: 1990-present
- Publisher: Mary Ann Liebert, Inc.
- Frequency: Monthly
- Open access: Hybrid
- Impact factor: 6.568 (2020)

Standard abbreviations
- ISO 4: Thyroid

Indexing
- CODEN: THYRER
- ISSN: 1050-7256 (print); 1557-9077 (web)
- OCLC no.: 21579335

Links
- Journal homepage; Online access

Thyroid is a medical journal in the field of endocrinology, covering research on diseases of the thyroid. It is the official journal of the American Thyroid Association and published by Mary Ann Liebert, Inc.
