= Leslie Cheng =

American mathematician

Leslie C. Cheng
- Education: 1998 PhD from the University of Pittsburgh
- Occupation: Mathematician
- Employer: Bryn Mawr College

Leslie C. Cheng is an American mathematician specializing in harmonic analysis. She holds the Rachel C. Hale Chair in Mathematics at Bryn Mawr College.

Cheng did poorly in calculus in high school, and began her undergraduate studies at Bryn Mawr in 1988 intending to study the humanities. However, she was converted to mathematics by faculty member Rhonda Hughes and graduated with a bachelor's degree in mathematics in 1992. She went to the University of Pittsburgh for graduate study, completing her Ph.D. there in 1998. Her dissertation, $L^p$ Estimates for Oscillatory Integral Operators, was supervised by Yibiao Pan.

After completing her doctorate, despite having offers for tenure-track faculty positions elsewhere, Cheng worked in temporary positions until getting an offer to return to Bryn Mawr in 2002. She was given the Rachel C. Hale Chair at Bryn Mawr in 2018 as recognition for her "commitment to her students, teaching excellence, and scholarship".
