= Bob Lloyd (cricketer) =

Australian cricketer (born 1940)

Personal information
- Born: 24 October 1940 (age 86); Gladstone, South Australia
- Source: Cricinfo, 12 August 2020

Bob Lloyd (born 24 October 1940) is an Australian cricketer. He played in sixteen first-class matches for South Australia between 1960 and 1967.

== See also ==
- List of South Australian representative cricketers
