= American Thyroid Association =

- Abbreviation: ATA
- Formation: 1923
- Type: Professional academy (non-profit)
- Legal status: active
- Purpose: professional education and research
- Location: Falls Church, Virginia
- Region served: U.S.
- Members: Thyroidologists
- Official language: English
- Secretary: Jacqueline Jonklaas, MD
- Main organ: Thyroid
- Budget: $2m
- Staff: 7
- Volunteers: 307
- Website: Official website thyroid.org

The American Thyroid Association (ATA) is a professional organization of over 1,700 medical specialists devoted to thyroid biology and to the prevention and treatment of thyroid disease through excellence in research, clinical care, education, and public health. The ATA publishes the journals Clinical Thyroidology for the Public and Signal. The peer-reviewed journals Thyroid, Clinical Thyroidology, and VideoEndocrinology are published through Mary Ann Liebert, Inc., publishers.
