= List of human anatomical parts named after people =

This is a list of human anatomical parts named after people. These are often called eponyms.

== Alphabetical list ==
For clarity, entries are listed by the name of the person associated with them, so Loop of Henle is listed under H not L.

=== A ===
- Achilles tendon – Achilles, Greek mythological character
- Aschoff-Tawara node – Ludwig Aschoff (1866-1942), German physician and pathologist, and Sunao Tawara (1873 – 1952), Japanese pathologist
- Adam's apple – Adam, Biblical figure
- Adonis's belt, Apollo's belt – Adonis, Apollo, Greek mythological characters
- Alcock's canal (pudendal canal) – Benjamin Alcock (1801–1859?), Irish anatomist
- Artery of Adamkiewicz – Albert Wojciech Adamkiewicz (1850–1921), Polish pathologist
- Atlas (anatomy) – Atlas (Mythology), A god in greek mythology
- Auerbach's plexus – Leopold Auerbach

=== B ===
- Bachmann's bundle – Jean George Bachmann (1877–1959), German-American physiologist
- Balbiani bodies – Édouard-Gérard Balbiani
- Barr bodies – Murray Barr (1908-1995), Canadian physician
- Bartholin's gland – Caspar Bartholin the Younger (1655–1738), Danish anatomist
- Batson's plexus – Oscar Vivian Batson (1894–1979), American anatomist
- Valve of Bauhin – Gaspard Bauhin (1560-1624), Swiss physicians and botanist
- Long thoracic nerve of Bell – Sir Charles Bell (1774–1842), Scottish surgeon-anatomist
- Duct of Bellini – Lorenzo Bellini (1643–1704), Italian anatomist
- Renal columns of Bertin – Exupere Joseph Bertin (1712–1781), French anatomist
- Betz cells – Vladimir Alekseyevich Betz (1834–1894), Ukrainian histologist
- Billroth's cords – Theodor Billroth (1829–1894), Austrian surgeon
- Bowman's capsule and Bowman's layer – Sir William Bowman (1816–1892), English surgeon-anatomist
- Broca's area – Paul Broca (1824–1880), French surgeon-anatomist
- Brodmann's areas – Korbinian Brodmann (1868–1918), German neurologist
- Brunner's glands – Johann Conrad Brunner (1653–1727), Swiss anatomist
- Buck's fascia – Gurdon Buck (1807–1877), American surgeon
- Berry's Ligament

=== C ===
- Cajal cell – Santiago Ramón y Cajal (1852–1934), Spanish pathologist
- Cajal–Retzius cell – Santiago Ramón y Cajal and Gustaf Retzius (1842–1919), Swedish histologist
- Calyx of Held – Hans Held (1866–1942), German Anatomist
- Calot's triangle – Jean-François Calot (1861–1944), French surgeon
- Fascia of Camper - Petrus Camper (1722-1789), Dutch physician, anatomist, physiologist, midwife, zoologist, anthropologist, palaeontologist and a naturalist
- Chassaignac tubercle – Charles Marie Édouard Chassaignac (1804–1879), French physician
- Chopart's joint – François Chopart (1743–1795), French surgeon
- Clara cell – Max Clara (1899–1966), German anatomist (renamed to Club cell after Max Clara's Nazi activities were discovered)
- Cloquet's canal – Jules Cloquet (1790–1883), French Anatomist
- Colles' fascia – Abraham Colles (1773–1843), Irish surgeon
- Cooper's fascia – Astley Cooper (1768–1841), English surgeon
- Inguinal ligament of Cooper or Cooper's iliopectineal ligament – Astley Cooper
- Cooper's suspensory ligaments – Astley Cooper
- Organ of Corti – Alfonso Corti (1822–1876), Italian microanatomist
- Cowper's glands – William Cowper (1666–1709), English surgeon-anatomist
- Cuvier ducts – Georges Cuvier (1769–1832), French Naturalist and comparative anatomist
- Canals of Lambert - described by Lambert in 1955

=== D ===
- Darwin's tubercle – Charles Darwin (1809–1882), British Naturalist
- Denonvilliers' fascia – Charles-Pierre Denonvilliers (1808–1872), French surgeon
- Descemet's membrane – Jean Descemet (1732–1810), French physician
- Space of Disse – Joseph Disse (1852–1912), German histologist
- Dorello's canal – Primo Dorello (1872–1963), Italian Anatomist.
- Pouch of Douglas, Douglas' line – James Douglas (1675–1742), Scottish anatomist

=== E ===
- Von Ebner's glands – Victor von Ebner (1842–1925), German histologist
- Edinger–Westphal nucleus – Ludwig Edinger (1855–1918), German neuroanatomist, and Karl Friedrich Otto Westphal (1833–1890), German neurologist
- Eustachian tube and Eustachian valve – Bartolomeo Eustachi (1500 / 1514 / 1520–1574), Italian anatomist

=== F ===
- Fallopian tube – Gabriele Falloppio (1523–1562), Italian anatomist

=== G ===
- Gallaudet's fascia – Bern Budd Gallaudet (1860–1934), American anatomist
- Gartner's duct – Hermann Treschow Gartner (1785–1827), Danish surgeon-anatomist
- Gerdy's Fibers – Pierre Nicolas Gerdy (1797–1856), French physician
- Gerota Capsule – Dumitru Gerota (1867–1939), Romanian urology surgeon-anatomist
- Giacomini vein – Carlo Giacomini (1840–1898) Italian anatomist
- Crescents of Giannuzzi – Giuseppe Oronzo Giannuzzi (1838–1876), Italian physiologist
- Glisson's capsule – Francis Glisson (1599?–1677), English anatomist
- Golgi apparatus and Golgi receptor – Camillo Golgi (1843–1926), Italian pathologist
- Graafian follicle – Regnier de Graaf (1641–1673), Dutch anatomist
- Gräfenberg spot (G-spot) – Ernst Gräfenberg (1881–1957), German-American gynecologist
- Great vein of Galen and the other veins of Galen – Galen (129 AD – 200 / 216 AD), an ancient Greek physician

=== H ===
- Hartmann's pouch – Henri Hubert Vadim Hartmann (1860–1952), German Surgeon
- Hasner's Fold – Joseph Hasner (1819–1892), Austrian ophthalmologist
- Haversian canal – Clopton Havers (1657–1702), English physician
- Spiral valves of Heister – Lorenz Heister (1683–1758), German surgeon-anatomist
- Loop of Henle – F. G. J. Henle (1809–1885), German pathologist
- Canals of Hering – Karl Ewald Konstantin Hering (1834–1918), German physiologist
- Hering's nerve – Heinrich Ewald Hering (1866–1948), Austrian physician
- Herring bodies – Percy Theodore Herring (1872–1967), English physiologist
- Heschl's gyri – Richard L. Heschl (1824–1881), Austrian anatomist
- Hesselbach's triangle – Franz Kaspar Hesselbach (1759–1816), German surgeon-anatomist
- Antrum of Highmore – Nathaniel Highmore (1613–1685), English surgeon-anatomist
- Bundle of His – Wilhelm His, Jr. (1863–1934), Swiss cardiologist
- Houston's muscle (Bulbocavernous Penile Fibers) – John Houston (1802–1845), Irish anatomist
- Houston's valves – John Houston (1802-1845), Irish anatomist
- Canal of Huguier – Pierre Charles Huguier (1804–1878), French surgeon-gynecologist
- Hurthle cell – Karl Hürthle (1860–1945), German histologist

=== I ===
- Iris (anatomy) – Iris, Greek mythological character
- Ito cells – Toshio Ito

=== K ===
- Keith–Flack node – Sir Arthur Keith (1866–1955), British anatomist and Martin Flack (1882–1931), British physiologist
- Kerckring's valves – Theodor Kerckring (1638–1693), Dutch anatomist
- Kernohan notch – James Watson Kernohan (1896–1981), Irish-American pathologist
- Kiesselbach's plexus – Wilhelm Kiesselbach (1839-1902), German otolaryngologist
- Koch's triangle – German pathologist Walter Koch
- Pores of Kohn – Hans Kohn
- Krause's end-bulbs – Wilhelm Krause
- Kupffer cells – Karl Wilhelm von Kupffer

=== L ===
- Langer's lines – Karl Langer
- Islets of Langerhans and Langerhans cell – Paul Langerhans
- Langhans giant cell – Theodor Langhans
- Lanz' point – Otto Lanz
- Lauth's canal – Thomas Lauth
- Leydig Cells – Franz Leydig
- Crypts of Lieberkühn – Johann Nathanael Lieberkühn
- Lisfranc joints – Jacques Lisfranc de St. Martin
- Lissauer's tract – Heinrich Lissauer
- Lister's tubercle – Joseph Lister
- Little's plexus
- Urethral glands of Littré – Alexis Littré
- Lockwood's ligament – Charles Barrett Lockwood
- Angle of Louis – Antoine Louis
- Lovibond's angle
- Lund's node
- Crypts of Luschka, Ducts of Luschka, Foramina of Luschka, and Luschka's joints – Hubert von Luschka

=== M ===
- Macewen's triangle – Sir William Macewen
- Foramen of Magendie – François Magendie
- McBurney's point – Charles McBurney
- Malpighian corpuscle – Marcello Malpighi, the name given to both renal corpuscle and splenic lymphoid nodules
- Meckel's cartilage and Meckel's diverticulum – Johann Friedrich Meckel
- Meibomian glands – Heinrich Meibom
- Meissner's corpuscle and Meissner's plexus – Georg Meissner
- Merkel cell – Friedrich Sigmund Merkel
- Meyer's loop
- Moll's gland – Jacob Anton Moll
- Space of Möll –
- Foramina of Monro – Alexander Monro
- Glands of Montgomery – William Fetherstone Montgomery
- Hydatids of Morgagni, and Lacunae of Morgagni – Giovanni Battista Morgagni
- Morison's pouch – James Rutherford Morison
- Müllerian ducts – Johannes Peter Müller

=== N ===
- Nissl bodies or granules and Nissl substance – Franz Nissl

=== O ===
- Sphincter of Oddi – Ruggero Oddi

=== P ===
- Pacinian corpuscles – Filippo Pacini
- Paneth cells – Joseph Paneth
- Papez circuit – James Papez
- Artery of Percheron – Gerard Percheron
- Peyer's patches – Johann Conrad Peyer
- Poupart's ligament – François Poupart
- Prussak's space – Alexander Prussak
- Purkinje cells – Jan E. Purkinje
- Purkinje fibres – Jan E. Purkinje
- Pimenta's Point

=== R ===
- Node of Ranvier – Louis-Antoine Ranvier
- Rathke's pouch – Martin Heinrich Rathke
- Reichert cartilage – Karl Bogislaus Reichert
- Remak's ganglia – Robert Remak
- Island of Reil – Johann Christian Reil (1759-1813)
- Renshaw cells – Birdsey Renshaw (1908–1948)
- Space of Retzius and Veins of Retzius – Anders Retzius
- Riedel's lobe – Bernhard Moritz Carl Ludwig Riedel
- Arc of Riolan – Jean Riolan the Younger
- Rokitansky–Aschoff sinuses – Carl Freiherr von Rokitansky and Ludwig Aschoff
- Rolandic fissure and fissure of Rolando – Luigi Rolando
- Rotter's lymph nodes – Josef Rotter
- Ruffini's corpuscles – Angelo Ruffini

=== S ===
- Duct of Santorini – Giovanni Domenico Santorini
- Fascia of Scarpa – Antonio Scarpa (1752–1832), Italian professor and anatomist
- Canal of Schlemm – Friedrich Schlemm
- Schwann Cell – Theodor Schwann
- Sertoli cell – Enrico Sertoli
- Sharpey's fibres – William Sharpey
- Shrapnell's membrane – Henry Jones Shrapnell
- Skene's gland – Alexander Skene
- Spiegelian fascia, Spiegelian line, Spiegelian lobe – Adriaan van den Spiegel
- Stensen's duct – Niels Stensen
- Stilling's canal
- Struthers' ligament – Sir John Struthers
- Sylvian aqueduct – Franciscus Sylvius

=== T ===
- Tawara branches – Sunao Tawara
- Thebesian foramina – Adam Christian Thebesius
- Thebesian valve – Adam Christian Thebesius
- Thebesian vein – Adam Christian Thebesius
- White lines of Toldt – Carl Toldt
- Torcular herophili – Herophilus
- Traube's space – Ludwig Traube
- Ligament, veil or bloodless fold of Treves—Sir Frederick Treves
- Ligament of Treitz – Václav Treitz
- Tulp's valve – Nicolaes Tulp

=== V ===
- Sinus of Valsalva – Antonio Maria Valsalva
- Ampulla of Vater – Abraham Vater
- Limbus of Vieussens – Raymond Vieussens
- Valve of Vieussens – Raymond Vieussens
- Vieussens valve of the Coronary Sinus – Raymond Vieussens
- Virchow–Robin spaces – Rudolf Virchow and Charles-Philippe Robin
- Virchow's node – Rudolf Virchow

=== W ===
- Waldeyer's tonsillar ring – Heinrich Wilhelm Gottfried von Waldeyer-Hartz (1836–1921), German anatomist
- Weibel–Palade body – Ewald R. Weibel (1929–2019), Swiss biologist, and George Emil Palade (1912–2008), Romanian-American cell biologist
- Wenckebach's bundle – Karel Frederik Wenckebach (1864–1940), Dutch anatomist
- Wernicke's area – Karl Wernicke (1848–1905), German physician, anatomist, psychiatrist and neuropathologist
- Wharton's duct and Wharton's jelly – Thomas Wharton (1614–1673), English physician and anatomist
- Circle of Willis – arterial circle in base of brain – Dr. Thomas Willis (1621–1675), English physician
- Foramen of Winslow – Jean-Jacques Bénigne Winslow (1669–1760), Danish-born French anatomist
- Duct of Wirsung – Johann Georg Wirsung (1589–1643), German anatomist
- Wolffian duct – Kaspar Friedrich Wolff (1733–1794), German physiologist
- Wormian bones – Ole Worm (1588–1654), Danish scientist

=== Z ===
- Zonule of Zinn – Johann Gottfried Zinn (1727–1759), German anatomist and botanist
- Organ of Zuckerkandl – Emil Zuckerkandl (1849–1910), Hungarian anatomist

== See also ==
- Human anatomy
- List of anatomical topics
- List of eponymous diseases
- List of eponymous medical signs
- List of eponymous medical treatments
- Lists of etymologies
- List of eponyms in neuroscience
