= Lauth =

Lauth is a surname. Notable people with the surname include:

- Benjamin Lauth (born 1981), German footballer;
- Bernard Lauth (1820–1894), American steel industry businessman;
- Ernest Alexandre Lauth (1803–1837), French anatomist;
- Franz Joseph Lauth (1822–1895), German Egyptologist;
- Frieda Lauth (1879–1949), South African botanical artist;
- Thomas Lauth (1758–1826), French anatomist.

== See also ==
- Lauth (Königsberg), a former quarter of Königsberg, Prussia
