= Valvula =

A valvula is a small valve or fold.

Valvula may refer to:

- Valvula tricuspidalis, the tricuspid valve of the heart
- Valvula sinus coronarii, the valve of coronary sinus
- Valvula venae cavae inferioris, the valve of the inferior vena cava
