= Millicent Franks =

South African botanical illustrator (1886–1961)

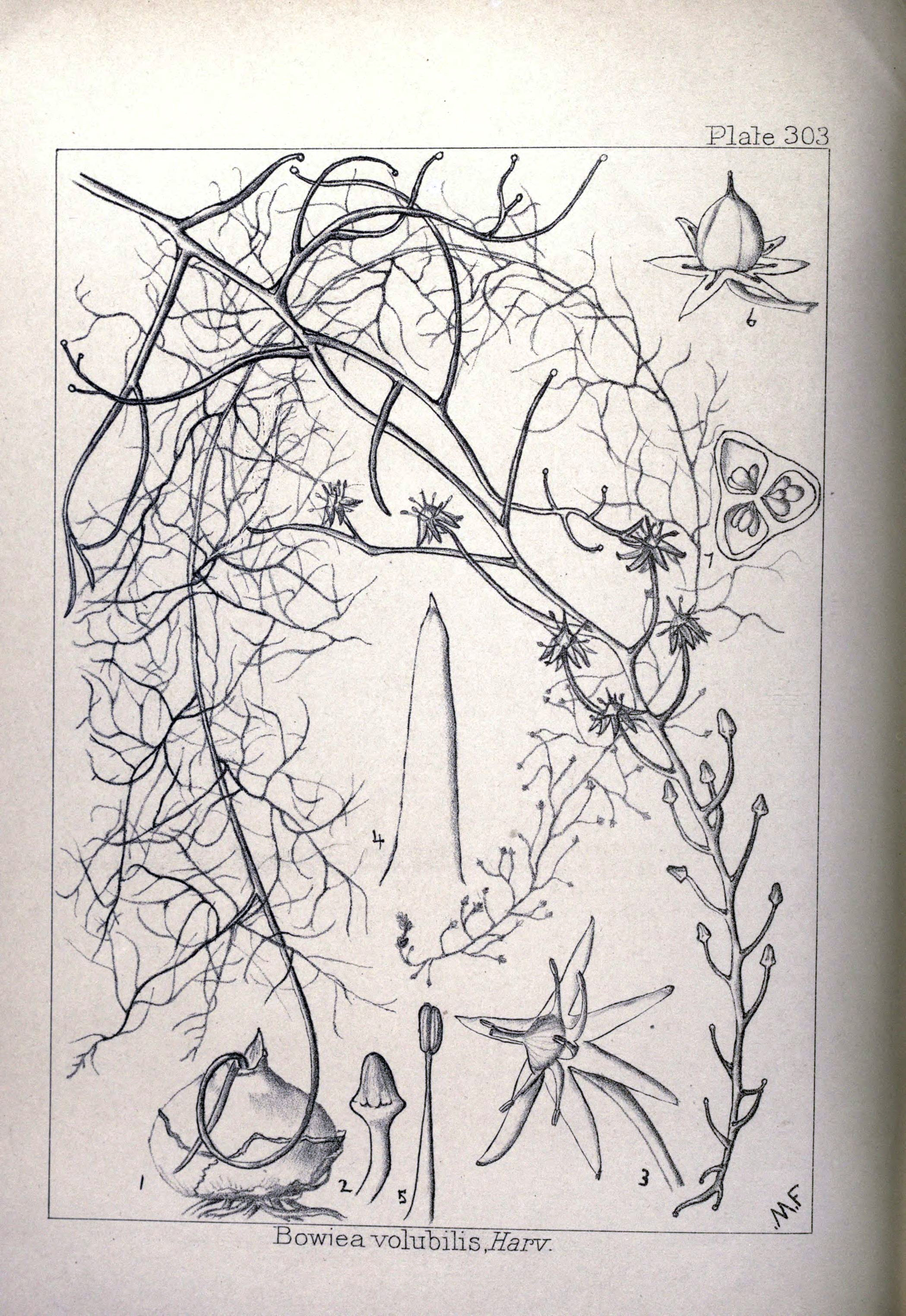
Bowiea volubilis

Millicent Franks (6 October 1886 Durban - 11 February 1961 Winchester) was a South African botanical illustrator.

At the age of 15, in November 1901, she took up the position of botanical artist and assistant to John Medley Wood at the Natal Herbarium in Durban, and when Frieda Lauth left the herbarium in 1903, Franks was appointed as chief botanical artist.

She produced most of the illustrations for volumes 3 to 6 of Wood's 'Natal Plants', also providing several illustrations for Rudolf Marloth's 'Flora of South Africa' (1913-1932). She collected and pressed some 370 plant specimens from Van Reenen, Camperdown and Durban, and these ended up at the Natal Herbarium and the National Herbarium in Pretoria. The standard author abbreviation Franks is used to indicate this person as the author when citing a botanical name.

Franks moved to England in November 1914, working for three months at Kew Gardens on illustrations for Wood's 'Natal Plants'. The following year she married Howard Flanders. She spent the last years of her life in Petersfield, where she was also buried.

She is commemorated in the species Sisyranthus franksiae, Celtis franksiae, Brachystelma franksiae and Euphorbia franksiae, all named by N.E. Brown, and Ischaemum franksae, named by John Medley Wood.
