= Shekleton =

Shekleton is a surname. Notable people with the surname include:

- Cameron Shekleton (born 2000), South African cricketer
- John Shekleton (1795–1824), Irish doctor and anatomist
- Vincent Shekleton (1896–2000), American football player
