= René-Joseph-Hyacinthe Bertin =

French anatomist

- Born: April 10, 1757; Gohard, France
- Died: August 15, 1828 (aged 71); Fougères, France
- Medical career
- Field: Anatomist, physician, cardiologist
- Institutions: Cochin Hospital
- Sub-specialties: Cardiac hypertrophy
- Notable works: Treatise on the Diseases of the Heart, and Great Vessels (1833)

René-Joseph-Hyacinthe Bertin (1757–1828) was a French anatomist known for his pioneer work in cardiology. He was the son of the anatomist Exupère Joseph Bertin.

== Early life and education ==
Bertin was born in Gohard, France on 10 April 1757. His father was Exupère-Joseph Bertin, who was a prominent physician remembered for his description on invaginated renal cortical tissue columns of Bertin. After studying in Paris, Bertin graduated from medical school at the University of Montpellier in 1791.

== Career ==
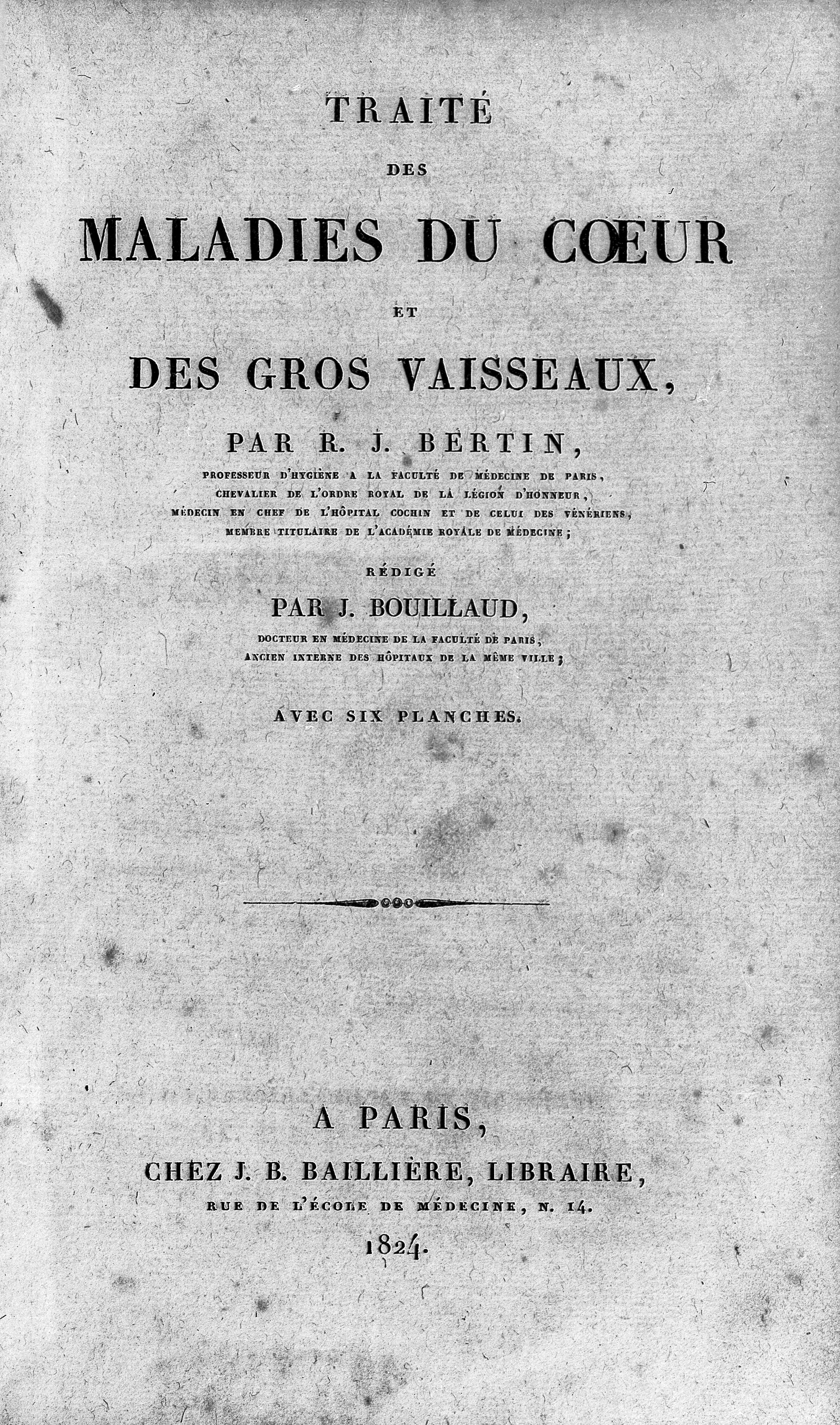
Traité des maladies du coeur et des gros vaisseaux

Bertin was a military physician during the French Revolution and in the Napoleonic wars. After his military service, Bertin then returned to Paris and became the physician-in-chief at Hôpital Cochin. He specialized in disorders of the cardiovascular system with his assistant Jean Baptiste Bouillaud.

Bertin was an early advocate of auscultation for elucidating the pathologies of cardiovascular disorders. He developed insight into the physical principles responsible for heart murmurs associated with valvular stenosis.

Bertin was especially interested in cardiac hypertrophy and originated the idea of having three designations of cardiac hypertrophy, which he called "eccentric", "concentric" and "simple" hypertrophy of the heart.

He was the author of Traité des Maladies du Coeur et des Gros Vaisseaux (Treatise of Diseases of the Heart and Major Vessels), an important work on the pathological anatomy of the heart. In this book, he discusses topics such as auscultation, valvular deformities, and hypertrophy of the heart. His student Jean-Baptiste Bouillaud assisted him with this edition.

== Death ==
Bertin died on 15 August 1828 in Fougères, France.

== Written works ==
Copied from the equivalent article at the French Wikipedia.

- Mémoire sur les maladies de la Guadeloupe, et ce qui peut y avoir rapport, 1778
- Doctrine médicale simplifiée, ou Éclaircissement et confirmation du nouveau système de médecine de Brown, 1798. (with Melchior Adam Weikard, Joseph Frank)
- Quelques observations critiques, philosophiques et médicales sur l'Angleterre, les anglais et les français détenus dans les prisons de Plymouth, 1800
- Traité des maladies du coeur et des gros vaisseaux, 1824. (with Jean Baptiste Bouillaud)
