= Prussak's space =

Recess of the middle ear

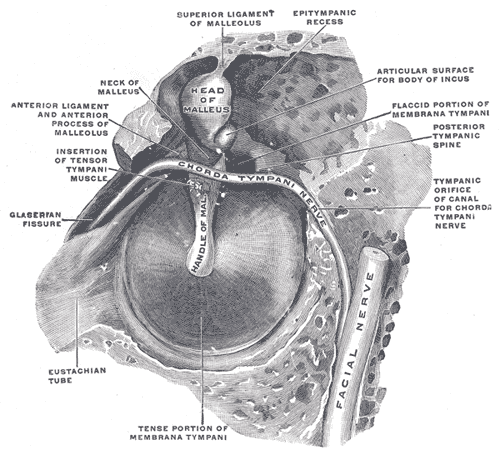
- The right membrana tympani with the hammer and the chorda tympani, viewed from within, from behind, and from above.

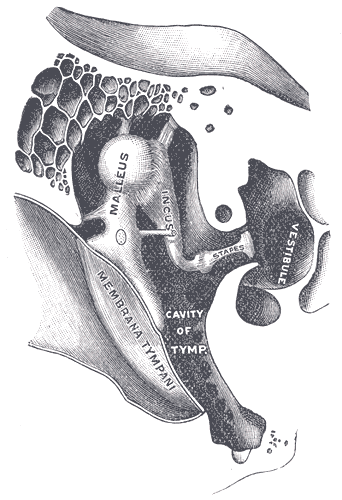
- Chain of ossicles and their ligaments, seen from the front in a vertical, transverse section of the tympanum.

In human anatomy, Prussak's space is the small middle ear recess, bordered laterally by the flaccid part of Shrapnell's membrane, superiorly by the scutum (a sharp bony spur that is formed by the superior wall of the external auditory canal) and lateral malleal ligament, inferiorly by the lateral process of the malleus, and medially by the neck of the malleus. From the neck of the malleus, the anterior malleolar fold and the anterior ligament arise, demarcating Prussak's space anteriorly. Ventilation of Prussak's space is only possible posteriorly above the posterior malleus fold.

It communicates with the posterior pouch of von Troltsch.

It is named after the Russian otologist Alexander Prussak (1839–1897).

== Boundaries ==
- Medially: neck of malleus and lateral malleolar ligament
- Laterally: pars flaccida
- Inferiorly: lateral process of malleus
- Superiorly: lateral malleolar fold and scutum
- "Anteriorly:" anterior malleolar ligament

== Clinical significance ==
Prussak's space is important because it is a site for pars flaccida acquired cholesteatoma formation. A cholesteatoma forms when there is a deep retraction pocket in the tympanic membrane. The lining of the tympanic membrane, which is skin, is shed, but if the membrane is retracted it gets trapped. The debris collects and enlarges and ultimately forms a cholesteatoma. This cholesteatoma, in turn, can erode the middle ear ossicles, facial nerve, inner ear and even involve the brain.

From Prussak's space, located in the epitympanum, cholesteatoma patterns of spread are:

- Posterior epitympanum - through superior incudal space to mastoid antrum,
- Posterior mesotympanum - inferiorly through the posterior pouch of von Troeltsch to the stapes, round window, sinus tympani and facial recess.
- Anterior epitympanum - anterior to head of malleus, may gain access to supratubal recess via anterior pouch of von Troeltsch.
