= Koch's triangle =

Anatomical area located in the right atrium of human heart

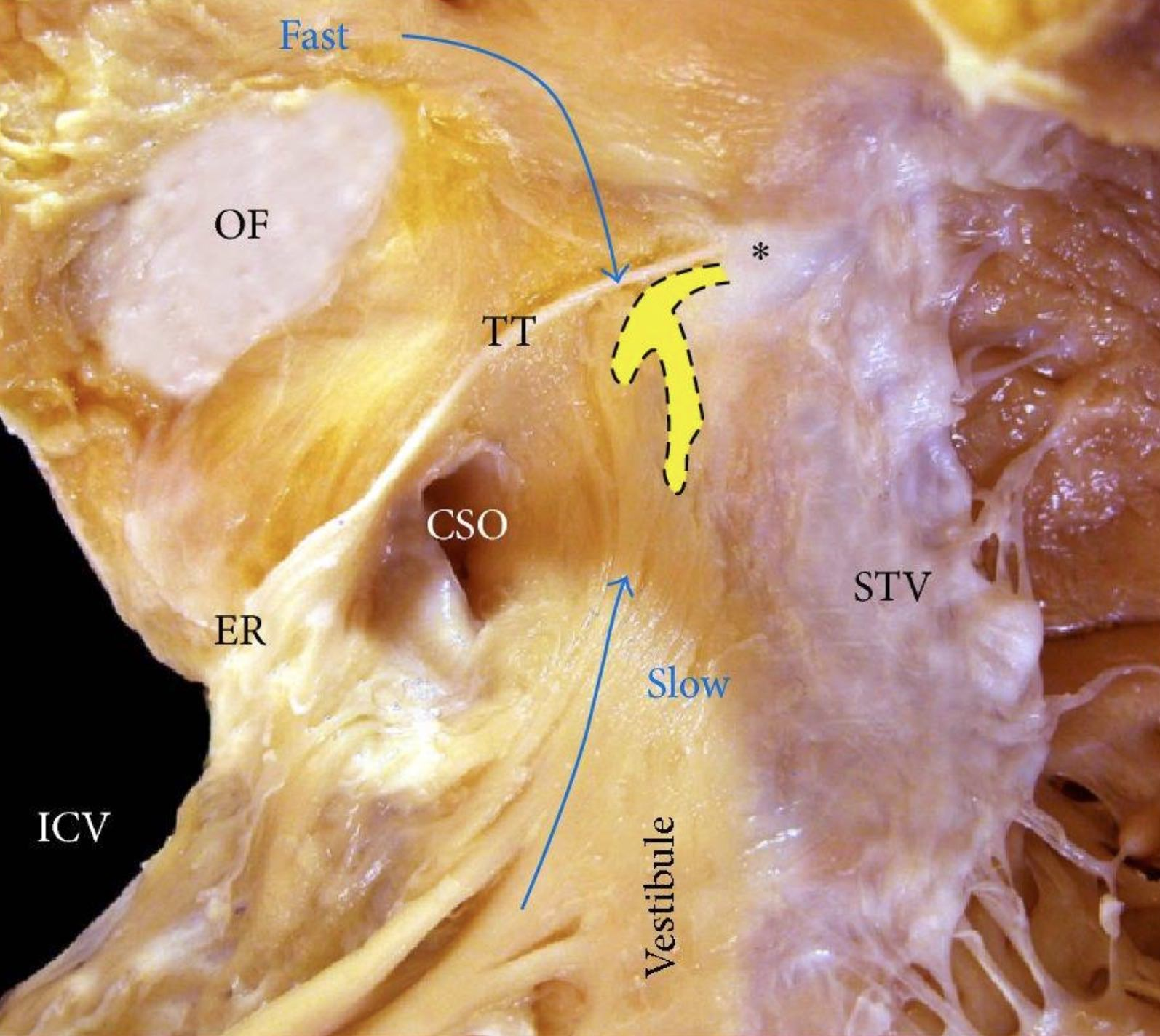
Dissection in right anterior oblique view of the right atrium shows the borders of the triangle of Koch. In this view, the putative fast and slow pathways toward the AV node (dotted shape in yellow) are depicted. Asterisk (*): central fibrous body, CSO: coronary sinus ostium, ER: Eustachian ridge, ICV: inferior cava vein, OF: oval fossa, STV: septal leaflet of the tricuspid valve, and TT: tendon of Todaro.

Koch's triangle, also known as the triangle of Koch, is named after the German pathologist Walter Koch. Arthur Keith was possibly the first to describe this triangular locus. It is an anatomical area located at the base of the right atrium, and its boundaries are the coronary sinus orifice, tendon of Todaro, and the septal leaflet of the right atrioventricular valve (also known as the tricuspid valve). It is anatomically significant because the atrioventricular node is located at the apex of the triangle. The base is formed by the coronary sinus orifice and the vestibule of the right atrium, and the hypotenuse is formed by the tendon of Todaro, which is often a continuation off the Eustachian valve. Other structures near to it are the membranous septum and the Eustachian ridge. Variations in the size of Koch's triangle are common.

The triangle of Koch is an important landmark for atrioventricular catheter ablation procedures for the localization of the atrioventricular node.

== Tendon of Todaro ==
The tendon of Todaro delimits the antero-superior boundary of the triangle of Koch. The apex of Koch's triangle is the location of the atrioventricular node. It is part of the fibrous skeleton of the heart, located in the right atrium. It was described by Italian anatomist Francesco Todaro. It is a continuation of the Eustachian valve of the inferior vena cava and the Thebesian valve of the coronary sinus.

The tendon is near-impossible to locate in a living heart, so clinicians use other features to determine the boundaries of the Koch's triangle. Some cardiologists even go as far as rejecting the usefulness of the tendon as an anatomical landmark altogether.
