= Francesco Todaro =

Italian politician

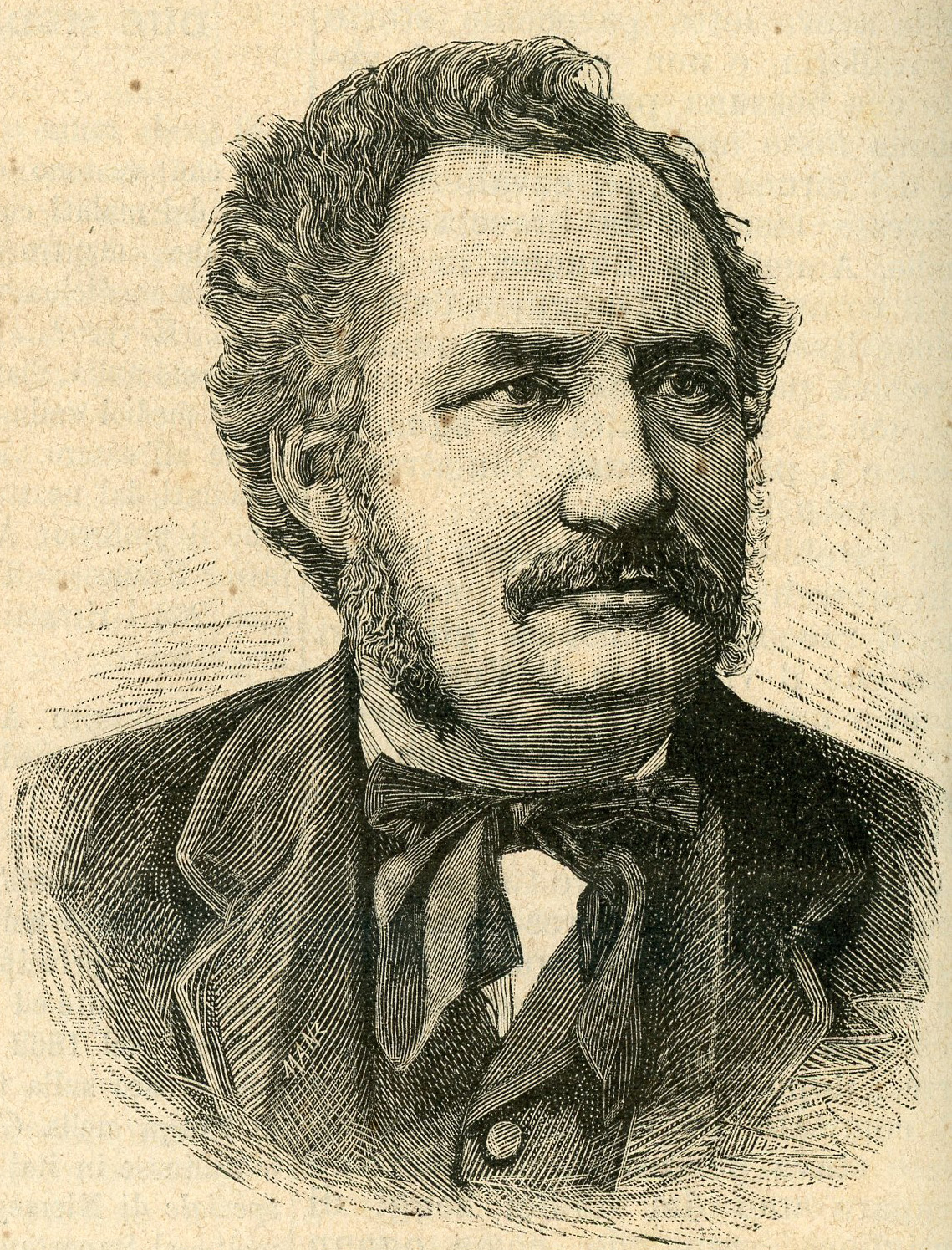

Francesco Todaro (14 February 1839 – 22 October 1918) was an Italian anatomist born in Tripi, a village in the province of Messina.

He taught classes in anatomy as Professor at the Universities of Messina and Rome.

In his anatomical studies on the structure of the heart, he described a fibrous extension of the Eustachian valve, now referred to as the "tendon of Todaro". In the field of zoology, he conducted extensive studies on a variety of tunicates known as salps.

In 1874 he became a member of the "Nazionale dei Lincei".

== Written works ==
- Sopra la struttura delle orecchiette del cuore umano (1865) - On the structure of the auricles of the human heart.
- Lo sviluppo e l'anatomia delle Salpe (1885) - The development and anatomy of salps.
