= Pierre Nicolas Gerdy =

French physician (1797–1856)

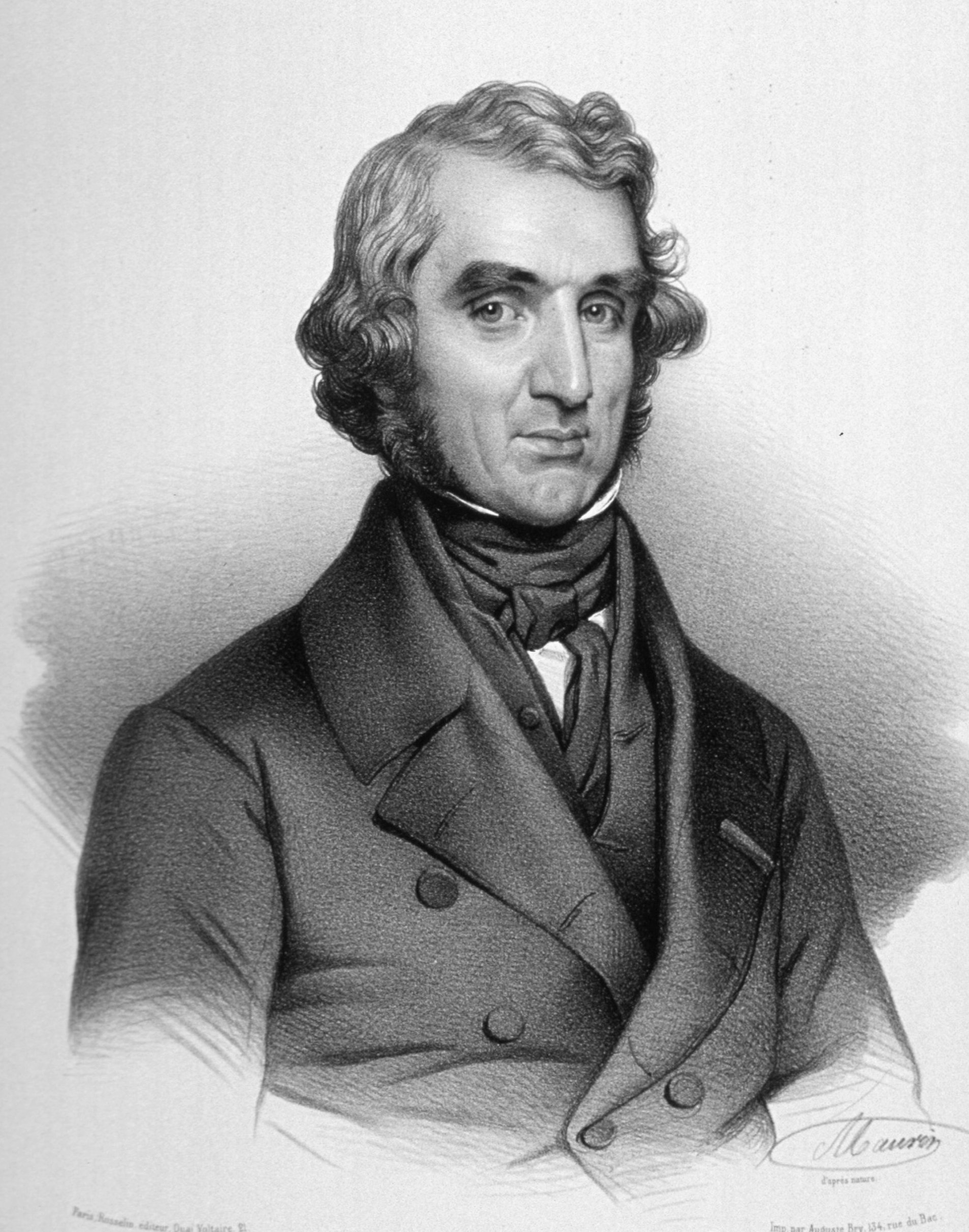

Pierre Nicolas Gerdy (1 May 1797 – 18 March 1856) was a French medical doctor who was a native of Loches-sur-Ource.

He was a professor with the Faculty of Medicine in Paris, and worked with renowned surgeons such as Jacques Lisfranc de St. Martin (1790–1847), Armand Velpeau (1795–1867) and Guillaume Dupuytren (1777–1835). The famed anatomist Paul Broca (1824–1880) was an assistant to Gerdy for a few years during the 1840s.

Gerdy was known for contributions as a surgeon, anatomist, pathologist and physiologist. He also worked with artists and sculptors, and in 1829 published Anatomie des formes extérieures du corps humain, appliqué à la peinture, à la sculpture et à la chirurgie, a book of anatomy as it applied to sculpture, painting and surgery. His name is associated with a number of anatomical eponyms, however most of these terms have since been replaced by clinical nomenclature:

- "Gerdy's fibers": Superficial transverse metacarpal ligament
- "Gerdy's fontanelle": sagittal fontanelle
- "Gerdy's hyoid fossa": Trigonum caroticum
- "Gerdy's interatrial loop": A muscular fasciculus in the interatrial septum of the heart, passing backward from the atrioventricular groove.
- "Gerdy's ligament": Suspensory ligament of axilla
- "Gerdy's tubercle": lateral tubercle of the tibia (Eponym actively used in medicine today).
