= Axillary fascia =

Details

Identifiers
- Latin: fascia axillaris
- TA98: A04.6.03.002
- TA2: 2537
- FMA: 37329

The pectoral fascia is very thin over the upper part of the pectoralis major, but thicker in the interval between it and the latissimus dorsi, where it closes in the axillary space and forms the axillary fascia. Axillary fascia, together with the skin, forms the base of the axilla.

== See also ==
- Suspensory ligament of axilla
