= Alexander Prussak =

Russian otologist (1839-1897)

Alexander Fedorovich Prussak
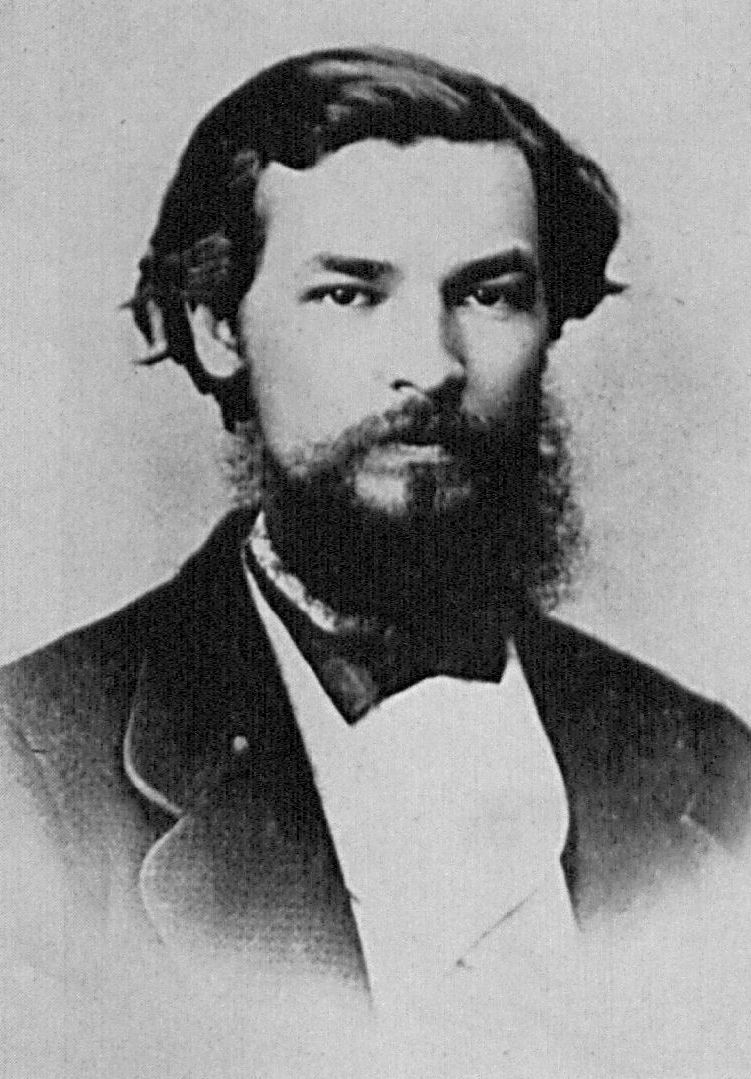
- Born: 1839; Moscow, Russian Empire
- Died: 1897 (aged 57–58); Saint Petersburg, Russian Empire
- Medical career
- Field: Otology

Alexander Fedorovich Prussak (1839 – 20 January 1897, in St. Petersburg) was a Russian otologist.

He studied at the Medical-Surgical Academy in St. Petersburg, obtaining his medical degree in 1862. Afterwards, he studied abroad for a few years, and following his return to St. Petersburg, he attained a professorship in otology at the Academy (1870).

He is remembered for his studies involving the vasomotor branches of the ear. His name is associated with "Prussak's fibers", which is elastic and connective tissue fiber bounding Shrapnell's membrane, and with "Prussak's space", a small recess of the middle ear.

In addition to his medical works written in Russian, he was the author of a few articles published in German, such as:

- Ueber die anatomischen Verhältnisse des Trommelfells zum Hammer, 1867 – On the anatomy of the tympanic membrane to the malleus.
- Zur Physiologie und Anatomie des Blutstromes in der Trommelhöhle, 1868 – The physiology and anatomy involving blood supply to the tympanic membrane.
