= Suspensory ligament of axilla =

Ligament of the armpit

Details

Identifiers
- Latin: ligamentum suspensorium axillae
- TA98: A04.6.03.003
- TA2: 2321
- FMA: 37414

The suspensory ligament of axilla, or Gerdy's ligament, is a suspensory ligament that connects the clavipectoral fascia to the axillary fascia. This union shapes the axilla (underarm).
