= Pimenta's point =

Pimenta's point is an anatomical landmark for easy location of the posterior tibial artery or tibialis posterior artery (a peripheral pulse on the inside of the ankle). An imagined line is drawn between the bony prominence of the medial malleolus and the insertion of the achilles tendon. At the exact midpoint of this line, placing three fingers parallel to the leg will result in one either feeling the posterior tibial pulsation (normal) or not (peripheral vascular disease or calcification, anatomical variant).

== See also ==
- List of human anatomical parts named after people
