= Royal City of Dublin Hospital =

- Health Service Executive
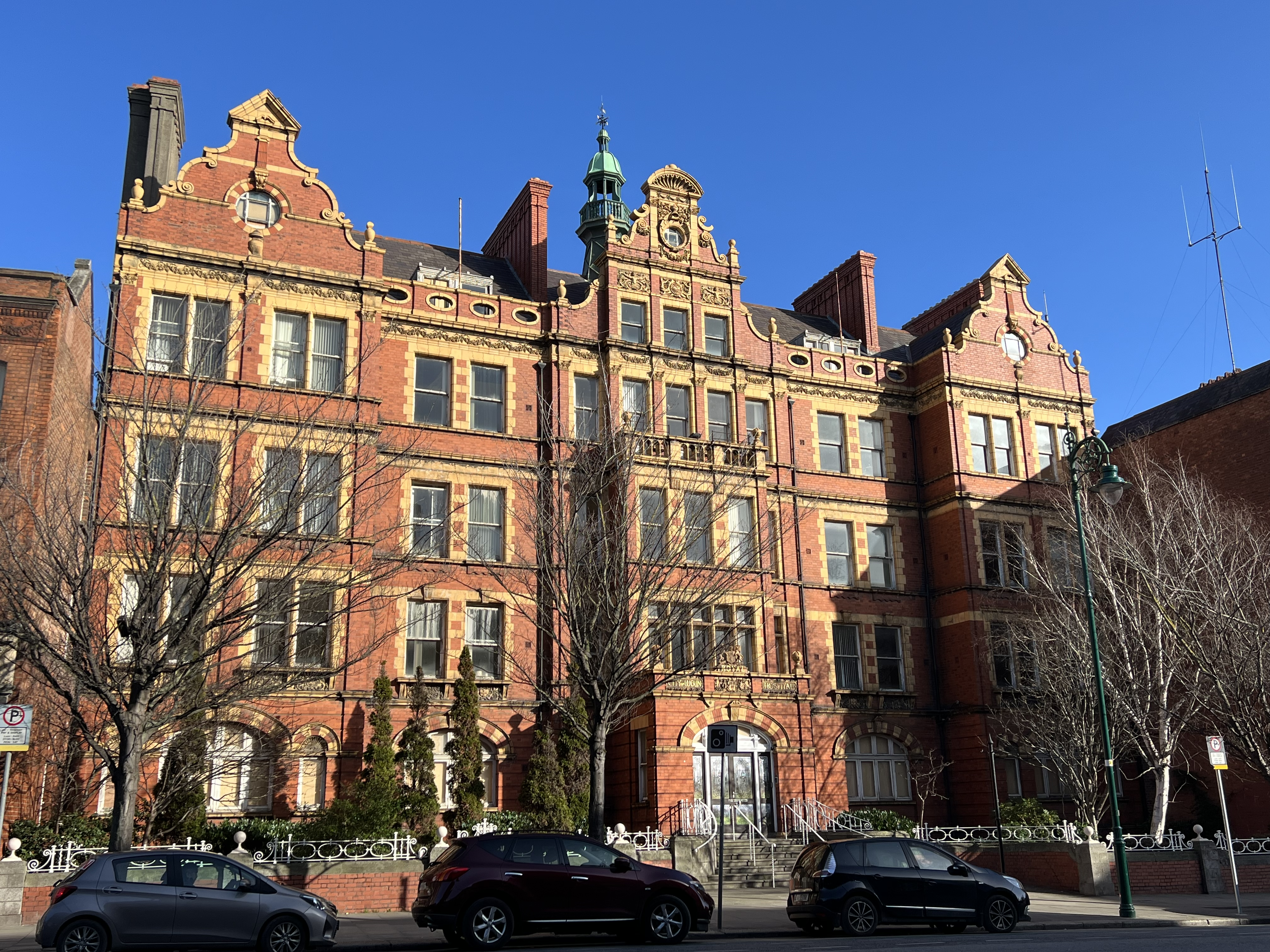
- Royal City of Dublin Hospital

- Shown in Dublin

Geography
- Location: Dublin, Ireland
- Coordinates: 53.3338°N 6.2440°W

Organisation
- Type: General

History
- Founded: 1832
- Closed: 1986

Links
- Lists: Hospitals in the Republic of Ireland

The Royal City of Dublin Hospital (Irish: Ospidéal Ríoga Chathair Bhaile Átha Cliath) was a health facility on Baggot Street, Dublin, Ireland. The building from which the hospital operated, which was vacant as of early 2024, is a protected structure.

== History ==
=== Opening and development ===
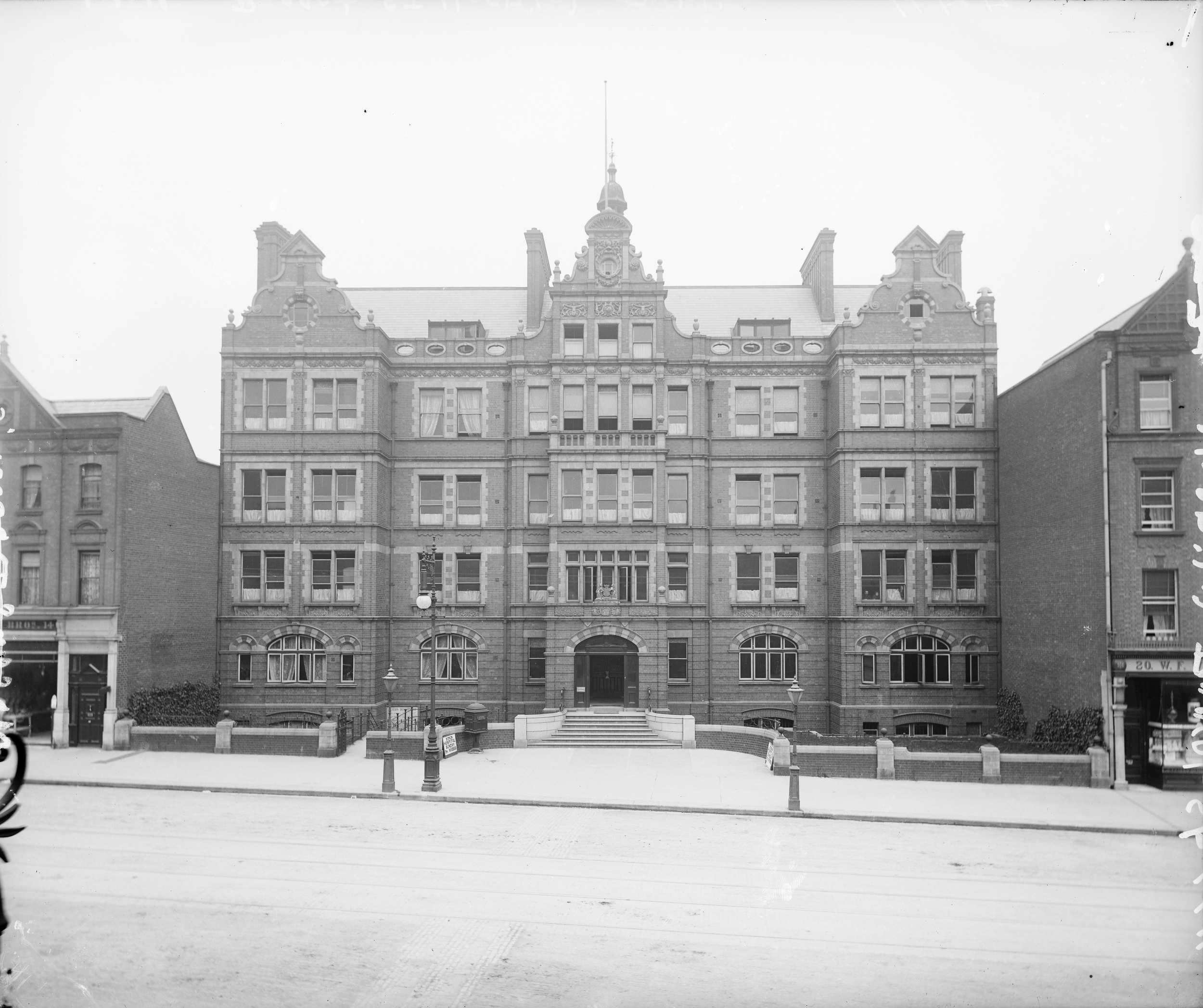
Royal City of Dublin Hospital (1913)

The hospital was first established by a group of doctors from the Royal College of Surgeons in Ireland as the Baggot Street Hospital in 1832. In the early years of the hospital, attending consultant surgeons included the anatomist John Houston.

The hospital was extended and the current façade of red brick and terracotta tiles was added, based on the designs of Albert Edward Murray, in 1893. It was renamed the Royal City of Dublin Hospital following a visit by Princess Alexandra in 1900.

=== Closure ===
After services were transferred to St. James's Hospital, the hospital closed in 1986. Although part of the building continued to be used for community services and some clinics, the Health Service Executive (HSE) closed these services in 2019.

While, in 2023, it was proposed that part of the building be used for the provision of primary care services, as of 2024 the building remained vacant. Though, as of April 2024, the HSE was reputedly still considering "using the Haddington Road side of the hospital site as the location for a new primary care centre", the remainder of the property was in poor condition and reportedly unsuitable for refurbishment for healthcare use. At that time, the HSE stated that the property was included on its schedule of vacant properties and "State register for disposal". The building was sold in late 2025, reportedly to the owners of the neighbouring Dylan Hotel.
