= List of human anatomical features =

The detailed list of human anatomical features.

- Head
  - Eye
  - Ear
  - Nose
    - Nostril
  - Mouth
    - Lip
    - Philtrum
    - Jaw
    - Mandible
    - Gingiva
    - Tooth
    - Tongue
- Throat
  - Adam's apple
- Vertebral column
- Arm
  - Elbow
  - Wrist
  - Hand
    - Fingers
    - Thumb
    - Nails
- Skin
  - Hair
- Thorax
  - Breast
- Abdomen
  - Genitalia
    - Penis (male)
    - Scrotum (male)
    - Vulva (female)
- Leg
  - Thigh
  - Knee
    - Kneecap
  - Calf
  - Ankle
  - Foot
    - Toes
- Buttocks
  - Anus

== Joints ==
- Development of the joints
- Classification of joints
- The kind of movement admitted in joints
- Articulations of the trunk
  - Articulations of the vertebral column
  - Articulation of the atlas with the epistropheus or axis
  - Articulations of the vertebral column with the cranium
  - Articulation of the mandible
  - Costovertebral articulations
  - Sternocostal articulations
  - Articulation of the manubrium and body of the sternum
  - Articulation of the vertebral column with the pelvis
  - Articulations of the pelvis
- Articulations of the upper extremity
  - Sternoclavicular articulation
  - Acromioclavicular articulation
  - Humeral articulation or shoulder-joint
  - Elbow-joint
  - Radioulnar articulation
  - Radiocarpal articulation or wrist-joint
  - Intercarpal articulations
  - Carpometacarpal articulations
  - Intermetacarpal articulations
  - Metacarpophalangeal articulations
  - Articulations of the digits
- Articulations of the lower extremity
  - Coxal articulation or hip-joint
  - The knee-joint
  - Articulations between the tibia and fibula
  - Talocrural articulation or ankle-joint
  - Intertarsal articulations
  - Tarsometatarsal articulations
  - Intermetatarsal articulations
  - Metatarsophalangeal articulations
  - Articulations of the digits
  - Arches of the foot

== Cardiovascular system ==
- The blood
- Development of the vascular system
- The thoracic cavity
  - The pericardium
  - The heart
  - Peculiarities in the vascular system in the fetus

== Anatomical landmarks ==
There are many anatomical landmarks of the body. On the trunk, the chest is referred to as the thoracic area. The shoulder in general is the acromial, while the curve of the shoulder is the deltoid. The back as a general area is the dorsum or dorsal area, and the lower back as the lumbus or lumbar region. The shoulderblades are the scapular area and the breastbone is the sternal region. The abdominal area is the region between the chest and the pelvis. The breast is called the mamma or mammary, the armpit as the axilla and axillary, and the navel as the umbilicus and umbilical. The pelvis is the lower torso, between the abdomen and the thighs. The groin, where the thigh joins the trunk, are the inguen and inguinal area.

The entire arm is referred to as the brachium and brachial, the front of the elbow as the antecubitis and antecubital, the back of the elbow as the olecranon or olecranal, the forearm as the antebrachium and antebrachial, the wrist as the carpus and carpal area, the hand as the manus and manual, the palm as the palma and palmar, the thumb as the pollex, and the fingers as the digits, phalanges, and phalangeal. The buttocks are the gluteus or gluteal region and the pubic area is the pubis.

Anatomists divide the lower limb into the thigh (the part of the limb between the hip and the knee) and the leg (which refers only to the area of the limb between the knee and the ankle). The thigh is the femur and the femoral region. The kneecap is the patella and patellar while the back of the knee is the popliteus and popliteal area. The leg (between the knee and the ankle) is the crus and crural area, the lateral aspect of the leg is the peroneal area, and the calf is the sura and sural region. The ankle is the tarsus and tarsal, and the heel is the calcaneus or calcaneal. The foot is the pes and pedal region, and the sole of the foot the planta and plantar. As with the fingers, the toes are also called the digits, phalanges, and phalangeal area. The big toe is referred to as the hallux.

== See also ==
- List of human anatomical parts named after people
- List of regions in the human brain
- Surface anatomy
