= Dorello's canal =

Bow-shaped canal in the temporal bone

Details
- Part of: Petrous part of temporal bone

Dorello's canal is a bow-shaped bony enclosure at the tip of the temporal bone. It contains the abducens nerve (CN VI), inferior petrosal sinus, and the dorsal meningeal artery (a branch of the meningohypophyseal trunk).

== Structure ==
Dorello's canal is a bow-shaped bony enclosure at the tip of the petrous part of the temporal bone. It is fairly short. Dura mater forms a sleeve within Dorello's canal, forming an outer wall. There may also be arachnoid mater. This contains the abducens nerve (VI) and the inferior petrosal sinus.

The petrosphenoidal ligament (Gruber's ligament, or petroclinoidal ligament) forms the roof of Dorello's canal.

== Function ==
Dorello's canal allows for passage of the abducens nerve (CN VI) and the inferior petrosal sinus as they travel to merge with the cavernous sinus.

== Clinical significance ==
Dorello's canal can entrap the abducens nerve (CN VI) after cranial trauma.

== History ==
Dorello's canal is named after the Italian anatomist Primo Dorello, who proved the existence of this canal after a series of dissections. Gruber's ligament, which forms part of Dorello's canal, is named after the anatomist Wenzel Leopold Gruber.

== See also ==
- Sixth nerve palsy
