= Walter Koch (physician) =

German pathologist (1880–1962)

Walter Eduard Carl Koch (3 May 1880 – 21 November 1962) was a German pathologist best known for the discovery of Koch's triangle, a triangular shaped area in the right atrium of the heart.

Born in Dortmund and educated in Freiburg im Breisgau and at the Kaiser Wilhelm Academy in Berlin, Koch obtained his doctorate in 1907 at Freiburg. As a military physician, he served at the pathological institute in Freiburg. Later on he worked in Berlin. Here he habilitated in general pathology and pathological anatomy in 1921. After being named a professor in 1922, he worked as head of department at Berlin's Westend hospital.
