= Gallaudet fascia =

Gallaudet fascia or Gallaudet's fascia may refer to:

- Fascia of perineum
- Buck's fascia
