= Hubert von Luschka =

German anatomist (1820–1875)

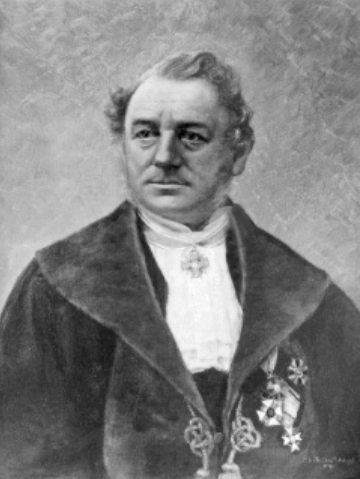
Hubert von Luschka

Hubert von Luschka, born Hubert Luschka (July 27, 1820 in Konstanz – March 1, 1875 in Tübingen), was a German anatomist. He lent his name to several structures, including the foramina of Luschka, Luschka's crypts, Luschka's joints, and Ducts of Luschka. His name is also associated with Luschka's law, an anatomical rule concerning location of the ureters.

Luschka began studying medicine, initially pharmacology, in 1841 at the University of Freiburg and the University of Heidelberg. In 1845 he became an assistant to Louis Stromeyer in Freiburg, then moved in 1849 to the University of Tübingen, where he was a lecturer and associate professor until being appointed a full professor of anatomy in 1855. A manuscript copy of lectures on surgical anatomy that he gave in Tübingen forms part of the Manchester Medical Manuscripts Collection held by special collections at the University of Manchester with the reference MMM/23/211. He gained a noble title and began using von in his name in 1865.

His work particularly concerned the need for anatomy to be connected in a practical manner to medicine and surgery. His Anatomie des Menschen in Rücksicht auf das Bedürfnis der praktischen Heilkunde (1862–69; "Human Anatomy in Consideration of the Needs of Practical Medicine") aimed to provide such a link. He promoted the use of anatomical information in surgery, for example to manipulate internal organs using long needles before cutting the body open, and was one of the first to conduct detailed research on normal corpses (rather than only diseased or anomalous ones), publishing a series of detailed books covering specific aspects of anatomy, such as the nerves of the hands and the blood vessels of the brain.

== Works ==
- Die Nerven in der harten Stirnhaut (1850) – The nerves of the forehead.
- Die Nerven des Menschlichen Wirbelkanales (1850) – The nerves of the human vertebral canal.
- Die Struktur der serösen Häute des Menschen (1851) – The structure of the serous membranes of man.
- Der nervus phrenicus des Menschen (1853) – The phrenic nerve of man.
- Die Adergeflechte des menschlichen Gehirns (1855) – The plexus of the human brain.
- Die Brustorgane des Menschen in ihrer Lage (1857) – The thoracic organs of man in their location.
- Die Halbgelenke des menschlichen Körpers (1858) – The "half-joints" of the human body.
- Die Halsrippen und die ossa suprasternalia (1859) – The cervical rib and the ossa suprasternalia.
- Der Herzbeutel und die Fascia endothoracica (1859) – The pericardium and the endothoracic fascia.
- Der Hirnanhang und die Steißdrüse des Menschen (1860) – The pituitary gland and the coccygeal glomus in humans
- Anatomie des Menschen in Rücksicht auf das Bedürfnis der praktischen Heilkunde (1862–69) – The anatomy of man in regards to practical medicine.
- Der Schlundkopf des Menschen (1868) – The pharynx of humans.
- Über Maß- und Zahlenverhältnisse des menschlichen Körpers (1871)
- Der Kehlkopf des Menschen (1871) – The larynx of humans.
- Die Lage der Bauchorgane (1873) – The location of the abdominal organs.
