= Primo Dorello =

Italian anatomist

- Born: 1872; Narni, Umbria, Italy
- Died: 1963
- Citizenship: Italian
- Known for: Dorello's canal

Primo Dorello (1872–1963) was an Italian anatomist. He is best known for identifying Dorello's canal.

== Personal life ==
Dorello was born in 1872 in Narni, Umbria. Dorello studied medicine at the University of Rome in 1897. He also had an interest in photography, particularly of Italian architecture. He died in 1963.

== Career ==
He later became an assistant professor at the University of Rome until 1922. He later went on to become the chair of human anatomy at the University of Perugia, a position he held for 20 years between 1926 and 1946. He remained an emeritus professor during retirement.

Dorello performed dissections of the previously-discovered Gruber ligament. These began in 1905. Beneath the Gruber ligament, he identified Dorello's canal. This contains the abducens nerve (CN VI) and the inferior petrosal sinus. His identification was confirmed years layer. He theorised possible diseases associated with Dorello's canal, including entrapment of the abducens nerve due to inflammation.

== Awards and recognitions ==
Dorello worked on anatomy topics in the Treccani Encyclopaedia. In 1939, he was nominated for the Nobel Prize in Physiology or Medicine. He also nominated four scientists for the prize.
