= Ernest Alexandre Lauth =

French anatomist

Ernest Alexandre Lauth (14 March 1803 – 24 March 1837) was a French anatomist. He was the son of anatomist Thomas Lauth (1758-1826).

== Education and career ==
He studied medicine at Strasbourg, receiving his doctorate in 1824 with a thesis on lymphatic vessels. He later became an associate professor of anatomy to the Faculté de médecine at Strasbourg. He was associated with several scientific societies, including being a resident member of the Société d'histoire naturelle de Strasbourg.

He is remembered for his pioneer investigations of the lymphatic system in birds and humans. In 1829 he published a handbook that provided a detailed account involving the injection and preparation of lymph vessels (in regards to anatomical viewing).

== Selected works ==
- Essai sur les vaisseaux lymphatiques. Strasbourg, 1824.
- Memoire sur les vaisseaux lymphatiques des oiseaux et sur la maniere de les preparer. Ann Sci Nat 3: 381, 1825.
- De 1'injection et de la preparation des vaisseaux lymphatiques, 1829.
- Nouveau manuel de l'anatomiste : comprenant la description succincte de toutes les parties du corps humain et la manière de les préparer, suivie de préceptes sur la confection des pièces de cabinet et sur leur conservation. Paris : Levrault, 1829; second edition (1835) revised and greatly expanded.
