= John Medley Wood =

South African botanist (1827–1915)

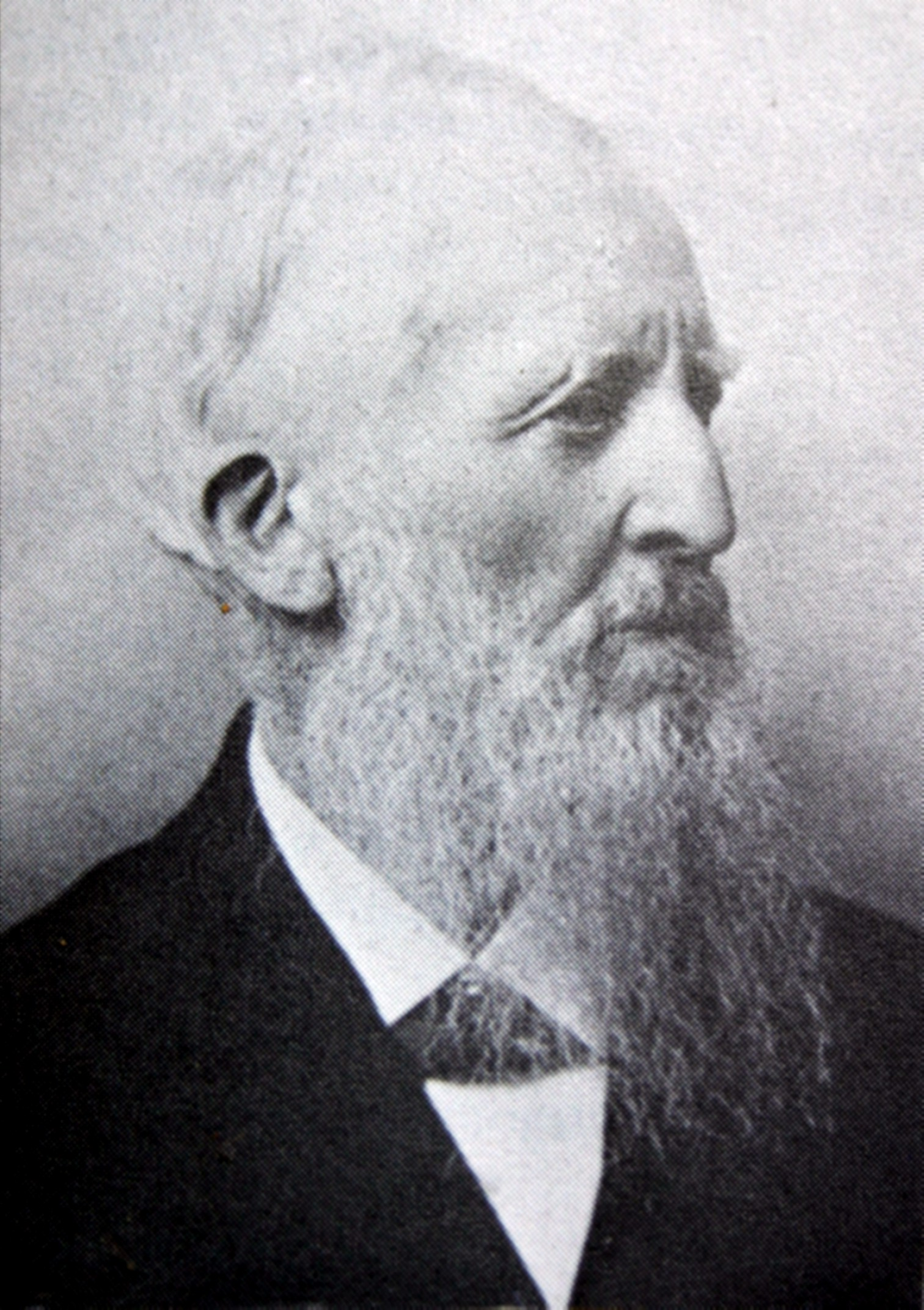
- Born: 1 December 1827; Mansfield, England
- Died: 26 September 1915 (aged 87); Durban, South Africa
- Education: University of Cape Town
- Awards: Linnean Society of London
- Scientific career
- Fields: Botanist
- Author abbrev. (botany): J.M.Wood

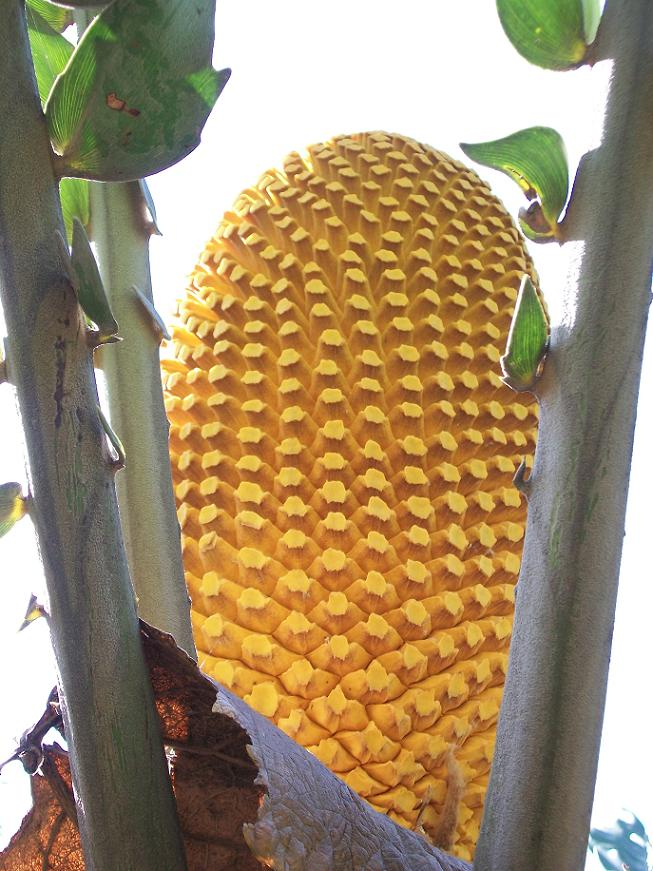
Male cone of Encephalartos woodii

John Medley Wood (1 December 1827 – 26 August 1915) was a South African/British botanist who contributed greatly to the knowledge of Natal ferns, is generally credited with the establishment of sugarcane mosaic virus immune Uba sugar cane in Natal and for his extensive collection of Natal plants.

== History ==
Wood was born in Mansfield to a lawyer James Riddall Wood and Hannah Healy Weaver. His father remarried Mary Haygarth and emigrated to Durban, and John, who had spent seven years at sea after leaving school, joined him there in 1852. He soon acquired his own property at the mouth of the Umdhloti River north of Durban. Here he experimented with new crop plants. In 1855 he married his stepmother's younger sister Elizabeth Haygarth.

For health reasons he moved further inland to Inanda in 1868, where he ran a trading store and did some farming. Here he developed an interest in cryptogams and started collecting ferns, mosses and fungi as well as flowering plants. He began corresponding with M.C. Cooke and Károly Kalchbrenner, the mycologists at Kew and in Budapest, Hungary. The Rev. John Buchanan, a local fern expert who had published a list of Natal ferns in 1875, assisted Medley Wood in that group. In 1880 Anton Rehmann, the Austrian botanist, visited Natal and took over Wood's collection of mosses.

As a result of his growing interest in botany, he accepted the post of curator of the Durban Botanic Gardens in 1882. From his interest in crop plants, he established the suitability of Uba sugar cane (Saccharum sinense L.), for conditions in Natal. During these years he collected plants extensively throughout Natal and exchanged duplicates with foreign herbaria.

He was preparing the seventh volume of his Natal Plants at the time of his death in 1915. He is commemorated in the genera Woodia Schltr., Woodiella Sydow and a large number of species names including that of Encephalartos woodii Sander, which he first discovered.

He was elected an Associate of the Linnean Society of London in 1887 and awarded an honorary D.Sc. from University of Cape Town in 1913.

== Publications ==
- A Popular Description of the Natal Ferns: Designed for the Use of Amateurs, &c. Durban. 1877.
- The Classification of Ferns. 1879
- An Analytical Key to the Natural Orders and Genera of Natal Indigenous Plants. 1888
- Preliminary Catalogue of Indigenous Natal Plants. 1894
- Natal Plants: Descriptions and Figures of Natal Indigenous Plants, with Notes on Their Distribution Economic Value, Native Names, Etc., Etc. Vol. 1 to 6. Bennett & Davis. 1912 [1898-1912]. in six volumes, (Volume 1 with M.S. Evans) (illustrated by Miss F.Lauth and Miss M.Franks)
- Handbook to the Flora of Natal. 1907
