= Henry Jones Shrapnell =

English anatomist

Henry Jones Shrapnell (1792–1834) was an English anatomist. For a period of time during his career he was a colleague to Edward Jenner (1749–1823), creator of the vaccine for smallpox.

Shrapnell is remembered for his pioneer work in otology. He was the first to correctly describe the tympanic membrane. He divided the membrane into two parts; the pars tensa (tense portion) and the pars flaccida (flaccid portion). In 1832 he published his findings in the London Medical Gazette in an article titled "On the form and structure of the membrana tympani". Today the flaccid portion of the tympanic membrane is known as "Shrapnell's membrane".

During the same year, Shrapnell published two other articles in the same journal, these being in regards to the function of the tympanic membrane and the nerves of the ear. In 1833, he published an article (again in the same journal) on the anatomy of the incus.
