= Adam Christian Thebesius =

German anatomist (1686–1732)

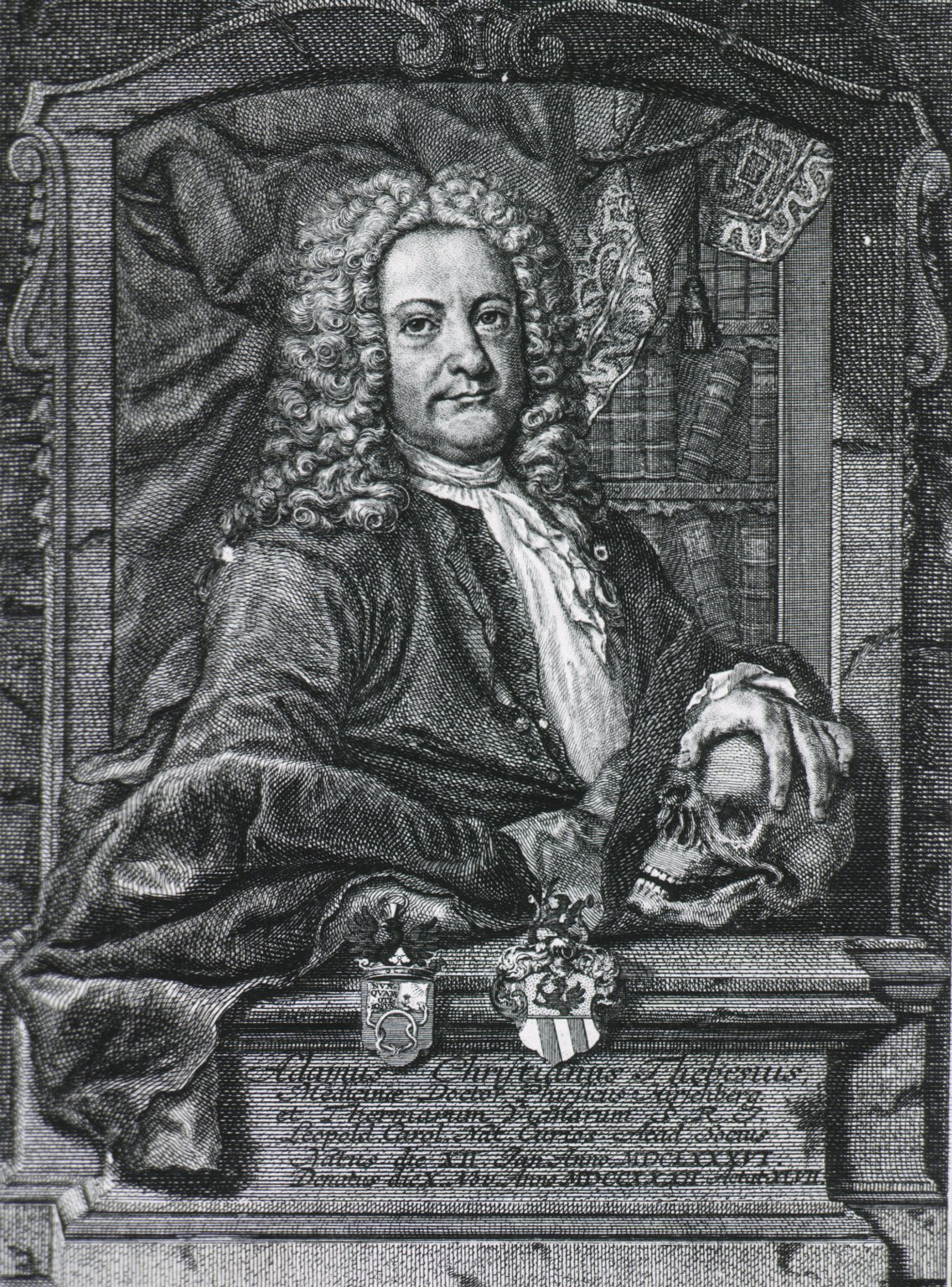
- Adam Christian Thebesius
- Born: January 12, 1686; Silesia
- Died: November 10, 1732 (aged 46)
- Known for: venae cordis minimae
- Scientific career
- Fields: anatomy
- Workplaces: University of Leiden

Adam Christian Thebesius (January 12, 1686 – November 10, 1732) was a German anatomist who was a native of Sandenwalde, Silesia.

He studied medicine in Jena, Leipzig and Leiden, receiving his doctorate from the University of Leiden in 1708. During the following year, he opened a medical practice in Hirschberg, and beginning in 1715 he served as Stadtphysikus (municipal physician) in Hirschberg, as well as a medical consultant to the nearby Warmbrunn spa.

Thebesius is known for his studies of coronary circulation. In his 1708 graduate thesis, De circulo sangunis in corde (from Latin: On the Circulation of the Blood in the Heart), he described the tiny cardiac venous tributaries that drain directly into the cardiac chambers. These veins are now known as "Thebesian veins", or venae cordis minimae, and the drainage pathway is referred to as the "Thebesian system". Two other anatomical structures that contain his name are:

- Thebesian foramina: Also known as foramina venarum minimarum or "Vieussens' foramina" after Raymond Vieussens (1635–1715). These structures are orifices of the Thebesian veins.
- Thebesian valve: The valve of the coronary sinus.
