= Smallest cardiac veins =

Small veins in the walls of all four heart chambers

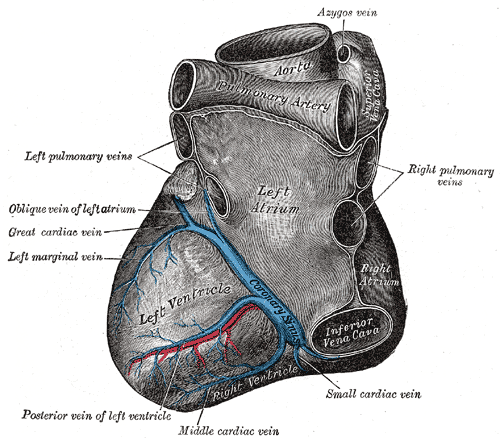

Details

Identifiers
- Latin: venae cardiacae minimae, venae cordis minimae
- TA98: A12.3.01.013
- TA2: 4169
- FMA: 71568

The smallest cardiac veins (also known as the Thebesian veins (named for Adam Christian Thebesius) are small, valveless veins in the walls of all four heart chambers that drain venous blood from the myocardium directly into any of the heart chambers.

They are most abundant in the right atrium, and least abundant in the left ventricle.

== Structure ==
The smallest cardiac veins vary greatly in size and number. Those draining the right atrium have a lumen of up to 2 mm in diameter, whereas those draining the right ventricle have lumens as small as 0.5 mm in diameter.

=== Course ===
They run a perpendicular course to the endocardial surface, directly connecting the heart chambers to the medium-sized, and larger coronary veins.

=== Openings ===
The openings of the smallest cardiac veins are located in the endocardium. Here the smallest cardiac veins return blood into the heart chambers from the capillary bed in the muscular cardiac wall, enabling a form of collateral circulation unique to the heart. Not every endocardial opening connects to the smallest cardiac veins, as some connect to the vessels of Wearn, which are arteries. Therefore, the endocardial opening must be traced to a vein before it is definitely called an opening of the smallest cardiac veins.

== Function ==
The small cardiac veins are responsible for venous return of 10% of the coronary blood supply. The small cardiac venous network is considered an alternative venous drainage of the myocardium. The smallest cardiac veins draining into the left heart, along with deoxygenated blood originating from the bronchial veins draining into the pulmonary veins, contribute to normal physiologic shunting of blood. As a consequence of the input of these vessels, blood in the left heart is less oxygenated than the blood found at the pulmonary capillary beds, usually to a very small degree.

== History ==
=== Etymology ===
The smallest cardiac veins are also known as the Thebesian veins. They are named after the German anatomist Adam Christian Thebesius, who described them in a 1708 treatise called Disputatio medica inauguralis de circulo sanguinis in corde (Inaugural medical discussion on the circulation of blood in the heart).

=== Mislabelling ===
The smallest cardiac veins are sometimes accurately referred to as vessels, but they are frequently confused with a distinct set of artery connections, eponymously referred to as the "vessels of Wearn". In his 1928 publication, Wearn himself referred to the arterio-cameral connections (vessels of Wearn) as Thebesian, but later, after additional research, provided disambiguation and strictly used the term Thebesian for coronary vein-heart chamber connections.
