= Accessory bile duct =

An accessory bile duct is a conduit that transports bile and is considered to be supernumerary or auxiliary to the biliary tree.

It may be described by its location relative to the gallbladder as supravesicular (superior to the gallbladder body) or subvesicular (inferior to the gallbladder body).

== Duct of Luschka ==
In the surgical literature, the term duct of Luschka is used to refer to an accessory bile duct. They are small ducts that distinctly enter the gallbladder bed, or small tributaries of minor intrahepatic radicals of the right hepatic ductal system. Originating from the hepatic parenchyma the accessory bile duct may enter a large bile duct or the gallbladder at any location. Rarely it is found to be connected directly to the GIT. They may not always drain bile and sometimes can have blind distal ends. One study showed them originating from the liver parenchyma of the right anterior inferior dorsal subsegment or from the connective tissue of the gallbladder bed. The study showed the distal connections ending at the hepatic right anterior inferior dorsal branch, hepatic right anterior branch, right hepatic duct, or common hepatic duct.

The term duct of Luschka is ambiguous, as it may refer to supravesicular or subvesicular ducts. Supravesicular ducts are typically in the gallbladder bed. A 2012 review suggested that the term duct of Luschka should be abandoned because of this ambiguity and replaced by the more specific term subvesical bile duct. As well, the exact origin and drainage locations of the relevant duct(s) varied greatly between patients.

Of 116 articles, 54 provided detailed anatomic information identifying 238 subvesical ducts, most of which represented accessory ducts. The origin and drainage of these ducts were limited primarily to the right lobe of the liver, but great variation was seen.

— -Schnelldorfer et al.,

== Clinical significance ==
Although they may not drain any liver parenchyma, they can be a source of a bile leak or biliary peritonitis after cholecystectomy in both adults and children. If an accessory bile duct goes unrecognized at the time of the gallbladder removal, 5–7 days post-operative the patient will develop bile peritonitis, an easily treatable complication with a morbidity rate of 44% if left untreated.

Often diagnosed by HIDA scan, a bile leak from an accessory bile duct post-op can be treated with a temporary biliary stent to redirect the bile from the liver into the intestine and allow the accessory duct to spontaneously seal itself or using a drainage guided by radiology.

== Eponym ==
The term is named after German anatomist Hubert von Luschka (1820-1875) who described the first case in 1863.
