= Space of Möll =

Details
- System: Lymphatic system
- Drains from: Space of Disse

In the hepatic lobule of the human digestive system, the space of Möll lies between the limiting plate and the connective tissue of the portal triad. This narrow interstitial space serves as a transitional zone for lymphatic drainage and communication between the space of Disse and the portal lymphatic vessels.

== Function ==
The space of Möll receives lymph originating in the space of Disse, where fluid and solutes pass from the hepatic sinusoids through fenestrated endothelial cells. It then conducts this lymph toward lymphatic capillaries within the portal tract, making it a key conduit in hepatic lymph formation and transport. The liver is responsible for producing nearly half of the lymph that enters the thoracic duct, and the space of Möll plays an integral role in this function by linking hepatocyte drainage pathways to larger lymphatic channels.

== Toxicological Significance ==
Environmental toxins such Perfluorooctane Sulfonate have been shown to damage the liver and specifically the space of Möll. Conversely, quercetin, a naturally occurring flavonoid, has demonstrated hepatoprotective effects.
