= Transverse folds of rectum =

Part of the digestive system

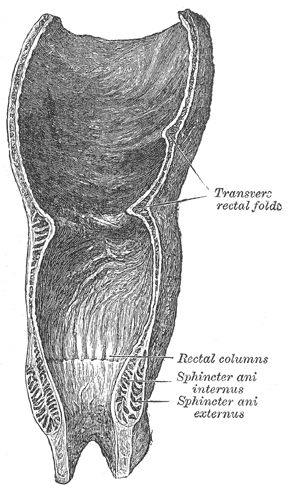
- Coronal section of rectum and anal canal.

- Anatomy of the anus and rectum

Details

Identifiers
- Latin: plicae transversae recti
- TA98: A05.7.04.007
- TA2: 3004
- FMA: 75657

The transverse folds of rectum (or Houston's valves or the valves of Houston) are semi-lunar transverse folds of the rectal wall that protrude into the rectum, not the anal canal as that lies below the rectum. Their use seems to be to support the weight of fecal matter, and prevent its urging toward the anus, which would produce a strong urge to defecate. Although the term rectum means straight, these transverse folds overlap each other during the empty state of the intestine to such an extent that, as Houston remarked, they require considerable maneuvering to conduct an instrument along the canal, as often occurs in sigmoidoscopy and colonoscopy.

These folds are about 12 mm. in width and are composed of the circular muscle coat of the rectum. They are usually three in number; sometimes a fourth is found, and occasionally only two are present.

- One is situated near the commencement of the rectum, on the right side.
- A second extends inward from the left side of the tube, opposite the middle of the sacrum.
- A third, the largest and most constant, projects backward from the forepart of the rectum, opposite the fundus of the urinary bladder.
- When a fourth is present, it is situated nearly 2.5 cm above the anus on the left and posterior wall of the tube.

Transverse folds were first described by Irish anatomist John Houston, curator of the Royal College of Surgeons in Ireland Museum, in 1830. They appear to be peculiar to human physiology: Baur (1863) looked for Houston's valves in a number of mammals, including wolf, bear, rhinoceros, and several Old World primates, but found no evidence. They are formed very early during human development, and may be visible in embryos of as little as 55 mm in length (10 weeks of gestational age.)
