= Veins of Retzius =

Blood vessels

The Veins of Retzius are located along the sides of the abdominal walls and communicate between tributaries of retroperitoneal parts of the gastrointestinal tract and veins of the body wall.
