= John Shekleton =

Irish doctor and anatomist

- Born: John Shekleton circa 1795; Dundalk, Ireland
- Died: 18 May 1824; Dublin, Ireland
- Occupation: Surgeon

John Shekleton (bapt. 5 April 1795 – 18 May 1824) was an Irish medical doctor and anatomist.

== Early life ==
Shekleton was born in Dundalk, Ireland, around the year 1795. He was one of 10 children: five boys and five girls. His mother was Margaret Pentland from County Louth and his father was a merchant named Joseph Shekleton. Shekleton's grandfather held property at Pepperstown in Ardee in County Louth. Shekleton attended primary school in Dundalk.

== Career ==
As the age of 15, Shekleton began training in medicine at the Royal College of Surgeons in Ireland under Abraham Colles. He graduated on 27 August 1816 and moved to Paris, France, to continue his studies. Shekleton returned to Ireland in 1817 and was appointed as anatomy demonstrator at RCSI. He was elected to membership of RCSI on 1 February 1819.

On 1 May 1820, RCSI established a museum with a budget of £200 per year, overseen by a five-member committee. Candidates for the position of curator were required to demonstrate examples of their anatomy specimens. Shekleton presented a mercury injection of the lymph system of the lower limb and was appointed as curator with a salary of £30 per annum. On 17 February 1821, Shekleton received an increased salary of £40. In 1823, he was promoted in title to conservator. As of 2014, Shekleton's winning specimen remains on display in the RCSI anatomy department.

By 1822, Shekleton has amassed over 600 specimens, which he increased to more than 1,300 by December 1823. The collection included natural history specimens in jars, partial and complete skeletons, and stuffed and mounted examples from nature. Shekleton discovered the muscle compressor venae dorsalis penis. After Shekleton's sudden death at the age of 29, he was succeeded as curator by his apprentice John Houston.

== Death ==
Shekleton's death on 18 May 1824 was attributed to sepsis from a needlestick injury acquired while performing an autopsy 11 days beforehand.
