= John Houston (doctor) =

Irish anatomist (c.1802–1845)

- Born: John Houston c. 1802; Ireland
- Died: 30 July 1845; Dublin, Ireland
- Occupation: Surgeon
- Known for: Houston's valves

John Houston (c. 1802 – 30 July 1845) was an Irish medical doctor and anatomist.

== Early life ==
Houston was born in about 1802 in Ireland. He was the eldest son of a Presbyterian minister but was adopted by his maternal uncle, Joseph Taylor, who was an army doctor. Taylor offered to fund Houston's education and on 13 January 1819 Houston moved to Dublin as apprentice to John Shekleton, a surgeon and curator at the Museum of the Royal College of Surgeons in Ireland (RCSI). Houston completed his apprenticeship in 1824, passing his final examinations and receiving his letters testimonial. On 19 June 1826, he was elected a member of the Royal College of Surgeons in Ireland days after the sudden death of his mentor Shekleton. Houston graduated from Edinburgh with a Doctor of Medicine degree in 1826.

== Career ==
Houston succeeded Shekleton as conservator (curator) at the RCSI museum. In 1830, Houston discovered the transverse folds of the rectum, eponymously known as Houston's valves. In 1834, he published a catalogue of the Museum's normal specimens, followed by a catalogue of pathology specimens in 1840. In 1843, he published a catalogue of the museum specimens at the Park Street School of Medicine. In 1844, Houston published an illustrated scientific paper in the Dublin Medical Press entitled "On the Microscopic Pathology of Cancer (with a Woodcut)" and is credited with introducing the microscope to Irish medicine. RCSI paid him £150 for his preparation of anatomical specimens. During his 17-year tenure as curator, Houston expanded and catalogued the RCSI museum's extensive specimen collection, described as "one of the most valuable in Europe" by renowned anatomists Friedrich Tiedemann and Jules Germain Cloquet.

Houston had a keen interest in teaching, working as an anatomy demonstrator at RCSI in 1824 and in 1837 taking a position as lecturer in surgery at the Park Street School of Medicine. He was known for his punctuality and was popular among his students. Houston was involved in the construction of the Baggot Street Hospital and was appointed as a surgeon there in 1832. He was also appointed consultant surgeon at St. Peter's Dispensary, a corresponding member of the Institute of Washington, and a member of the Society of Naturalists and Physicians of Heidelberg. He held private practice on York Street near RCSI. Houston was a member of the Royal Irish Academy.

== Selected papers ==
- "On the Structure and Mechanism of the Tongue of the Chameleon" - Transactions of the Royal Irish Academy, 1828
- "Dropsy" - 1842
- "The mode of Treatment in Fever" - 1844

== Death ==
Houston collapsed suddenly in April 1845 while lecturing at Baggot Street Hospital. He had suffered a cerebral haemorrhage and died 30 July 1845. An obituary appeared in the Dublin Quarterly Journal of Medical Science the following year.
