= Spigelian fascia =

Spigelian fascia may refer to:

- The combined ventral aponeuroses of the external abdominal oblique muscle, the internal abdominal oblique muscle and transversus abdominis muscle
- Just the ventral aponeurosis of the transversus abdominis muscle
