= Luschka's joints =

Type of joint located in the cervical region of the vertebral column

In anatomy, Luschka's joints (also called uncovertebral joints, neurocentral joints) are formed between uncinate process or "uncus" below and uncovertebral articulation above. They are located in the cervical region of the vertebral column from C3 to C7. Two lips project upward from the superior surface of the vertebral body below, and one projects downward from the inferior surface of vertebral body above. They allow for flexion and extension and limit lateral flexion in the cervical spine.

Pathological processes that can occur in these joints include degenerative changes or hypertrophic arthritis, resulting in foraminal stenosis and nerve compression. Foraminal stenosis at this joint is the most common cause of cervical nerve root pressure.

They were characterized by Hubert von Luschka in 1858.
