= Exupere Joseph Bertin =

French anatomist (1712–1781)

Exupere Joseph Bertin (25 June 1712 – 21 February 1781) was a French anatomist born in Tremblay (Ille-et-Vilaine), Brittany. He was the father of cardiologist René-Joseph-Hyacinthe Bertin (1757-1828).

He served as regent of the Académie Nationale de Médecine in Paris and was "first physician" to the royal army. He is remembered for his research on the renal system. His best known written work is in the field of osteology, Traité D'ostéologie (1754, 4 volumes).

== Early life and education ==
Exupere Joseph Bertin was born on 25 June 1712 in Tremblay (Ille-et-Vilaine), Brittany.

== Career ==
The columns of Bertin are named after him, as are "Bertin's ossicles" (sphenoidal conchae) and "Bertin's ligament" (iliofemoral ligament).
