= Human anatomy =

Scientific study of the morphology of the human body

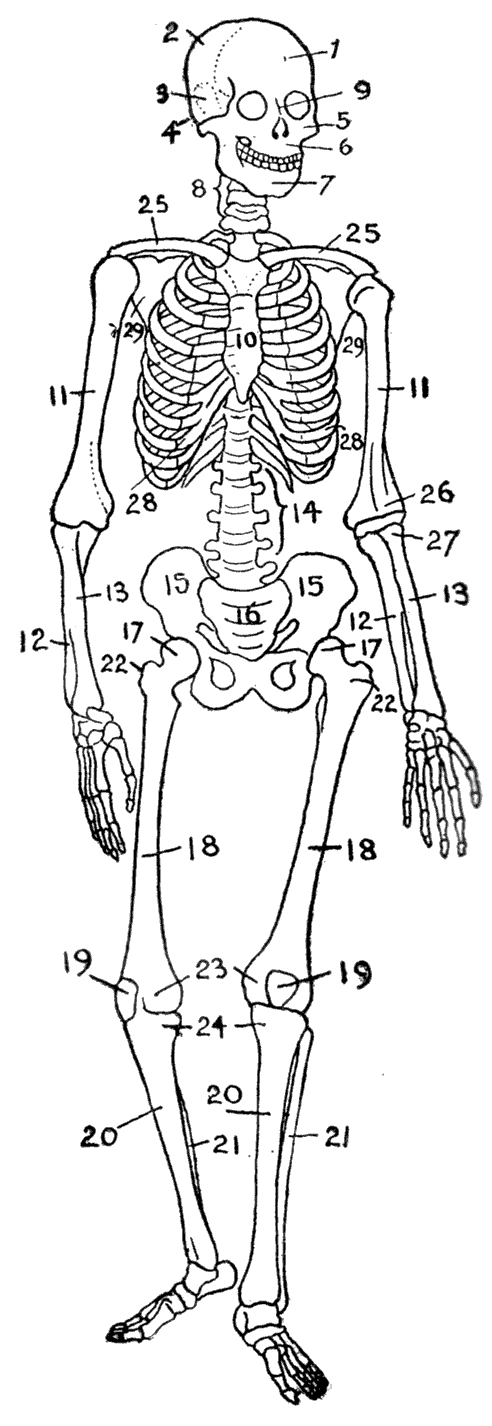
The skeleton

The nervous system

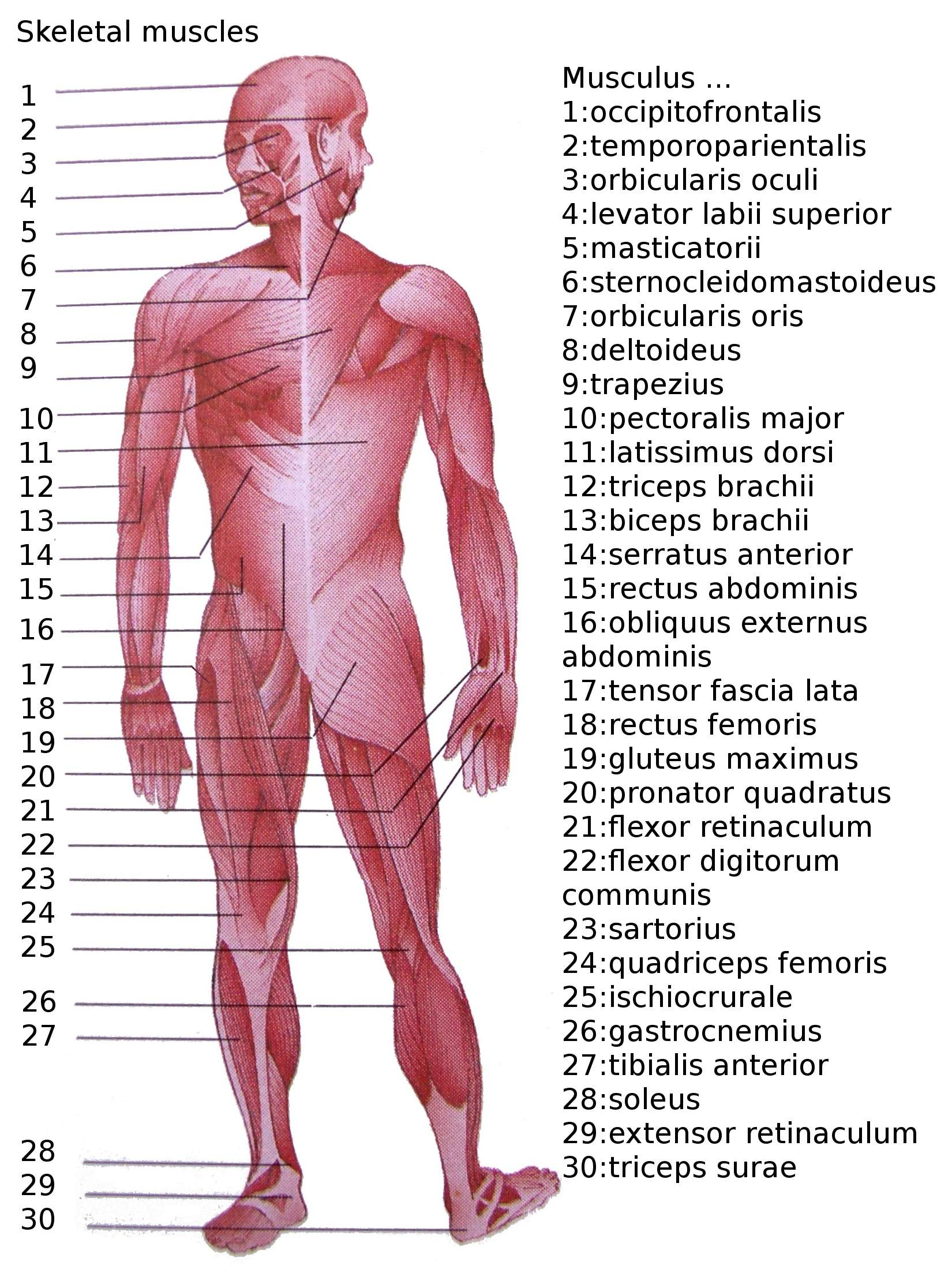
The muscles

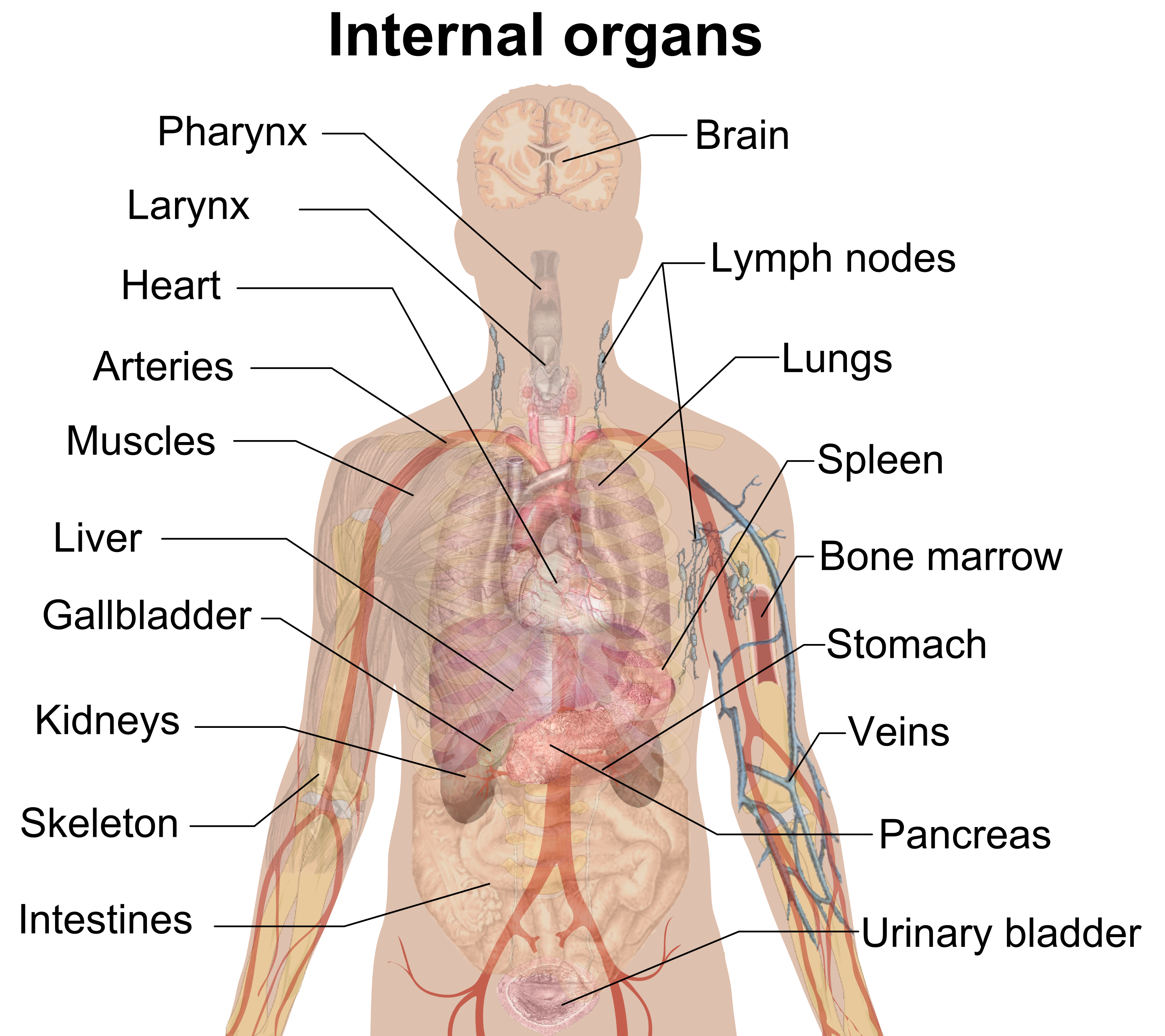
The internal organs and their contents

Human anatomy (gr. ἀνατομία, "dissection", from ἀνά, "up", and τέμνειν, "cut") is primarily the scientific study of the morphology of the human body. Anatomy is subdivided into gross anatomy and microscopic anatomy. Gross anatomy (also called macroscopic anatomy, topographical anatomy, regional anatomy, or anthropotomy) is the study of anatomical structures that can be seen by the naked eye. Microscopic anatomy is the study of minute anatomical structures assisted with microscopes, which includes histology (the study of the organization of tissues), and cytology (the study of cells). Anatomy, human physiology (the study of function), and biochemistry (the study of the chemistry of living structures) are complementary basic medical sciences that are generally together (or in tandem) to students studying medical sciences.

In some of its facets human anatomy is closely related to embryology, comparative anatomy and comparative embryology, through common roots in evolution; for example, much of the human body maintains the ancient segmental pattern that is present in all vertebrates with basic units being repeated, which is particularly obvious in the vertebral column and in the ribcage, and can be traced from very early embryos.

The human body consists of biological systems, that consist of organs, that consist of tissues, that consist of cells and connective tissue.

The history of anatomy has been characterized, over a long period of time, by a continually developing understanding of the functions of organs and structures of the body. Methods have also advanced dramatically, advancing from examination of animals through dissection of fresh and preserved cadavers (corpses) to technologically complex techniques developed in the 20th century.

== Study ==
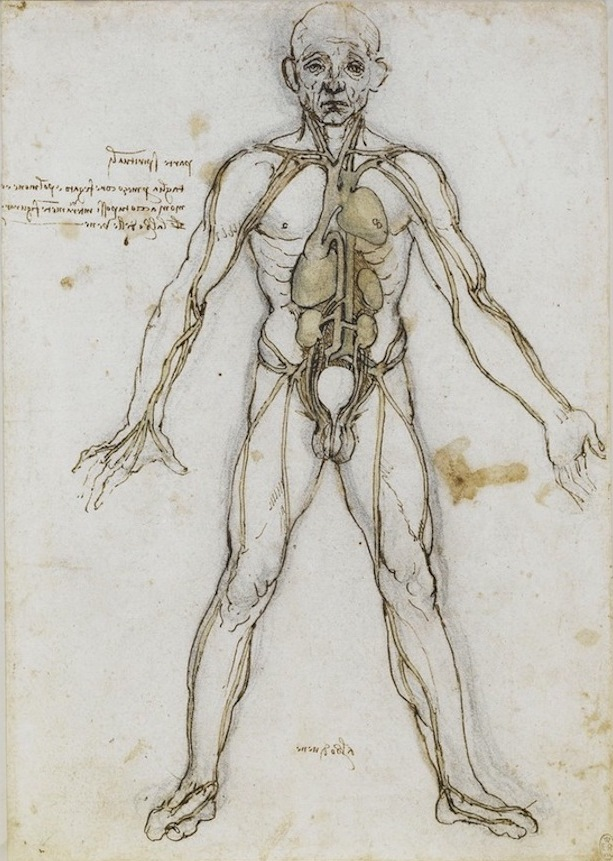
Anatomical study by Leonardo da Vinci

Generally, physicians, dentists, physiotherapists, nurses, paramedics, radiographers, and students of certain biological sciences, learn gross anatomy and microscopic anatomy from anatomical models, skeletons, textbooks, diagrams, photographs, lectures, and tutorials. The study of microscopic anatomy (or histology) can be aided by practical experience examining histological preparations (or slides) under a microscope; and in addition, medical and dental students generally also learn anatomy with practical experience of dissection and inspection of cadavers (dead human bodies). A thorough working knowledge of anatomy is required for all medical doctors, especially surgeons, and doctors working in some diagnostic specialities, such as histopathology and radiology.

Human anatomy, physiology, and biochemistry are basic medical sciences, which are generally taught to medical students in their first year at medical school. Human anatomy can be taught regionally or systemically; that is, respectively, studying anatomy by bodily regions such as the head and chest, or studying by specific systems, such as the nervous or respiratory systems. The major anatomy textbook, Gray's Anatomy, has recently been reorganized from a systems format to a regional format, which is in line with the modern teaching.

== Anatomy in visual arts ==
Gross anatomy has become a key part of visual arts. Basic concepts of how muscles and bones function and deform with movement is key to drawing, painting or animating a human figure. Many books such as Human Anatomy for Artists: The Elements of Form, are written as a guide to drawing the human body anatomically correctly. Leonardo da Vinci sought to improve his art through a better understanding of human anatomy. In the process he advanced both human anatomy and its representation in art.

Because the structure of a living organism is complex, anatomy is organized by levels, from the smallest components of cells to the largest organs and their relationship to other organs.

== Approaches ==
=== Regional groups ===
- Head and neck – includes everything above the thoracic inlet
- Upper limb – includes the hand, wrist, forearm, elbow, arm, shoulder
- Thorax – the region of the chest from the thoracic inlet to the thoracic diaphragm
- Human abdomen to the pelvic brim or to the pelvic inlet
- The back – the spine and its components, the vertebrae, sacrum, coccyx, intervertebral disks
- Pelvis and perineum – the pelvis consists of everything from the pelvic inlet to the pelvic diaphragm; the perineum is the region between the sex organs and the anus
- Lower limb – everything below the inguinal ligament, including the hip, the thigh, the knee, the leg, the ankle, the foot

=== Internal organs (by region) ===
Head and neck

- Brain
  - Basal ganglia
  - Brain stem
    - Medulla
    - Midbrain
    - Pons
  - Cerebellum
  - Cerebrum
  - Cerebral cortex
  - Hypothalamus
  - Limbic system
    - Amygdala
- Eyes (2)
- Pineal gland
- Pituitary gland
- Thyroid gland
- Parathyroid glands (4)

Thorax

- Heart
- Lungs (2)
- Esophagus
- Thymus gland
- Pleura

Abdomen and pelvis (both sexes)

- Adrenal glands (2)
- Appendix
- Bladder
- Gallbladder
- Large intestine
- Small intestine
- Kidneys (2)
- Liver
- Pancreas – gland
- Spleen
- Stomach

Male pelvis

- Prostate gland
- Testes – glands (2)

Female pelvis

- Ovaries – glands (2)
- Uterus

=== Major organ systems ===
- Circulatory system: pumping and channeling blood to and from the body and lungs with heart, blood, blood vessels
- Digestive system: digestion and processing food with salivary glands, esophagus, stomach, liver, gallbladder, pancreas, intestines, rectum, anus
- Endocrine system: communication within the body using hormones made by endocrine glands such as the hypothalamus, pituitary gland, pineal gland, thyroid, parathyroid glands, adrenal glands
- Immune system: the system that fights off disease; composed of leukocytes, tonsils, adenoids, thymus, spleen
- Integumentary system: skin, hair, nails
- Lymphatic system: structures involved in the transfer of lymph between tissues and the blood stream, the lymph and the nodes and vessels that transport it
- Musculoskeletal system: muscles provide movement and a skeleton provides structural support and protection with bones, cartilage, ligaments, tendons
- Nervous system: collecting, transferring and processing information with brain, spinal cord, nerves
- Reproductive system: the sex organs; in the female; ovaries, fallopian tubes, uterus, vagina, mammary glands, and in the male; testicles, vas deferens, seminal vesicles, prostate, penis
- Respiratory system: the organs used for breathing, the pharynx, larynx, trachea, bronchi, lungs, diaphragm
- Urinary system: kidneys, ureters, bladder, urethra involved in fluid balance, electrolyte balance, and excretion of urine

=== Surface anatomy ===
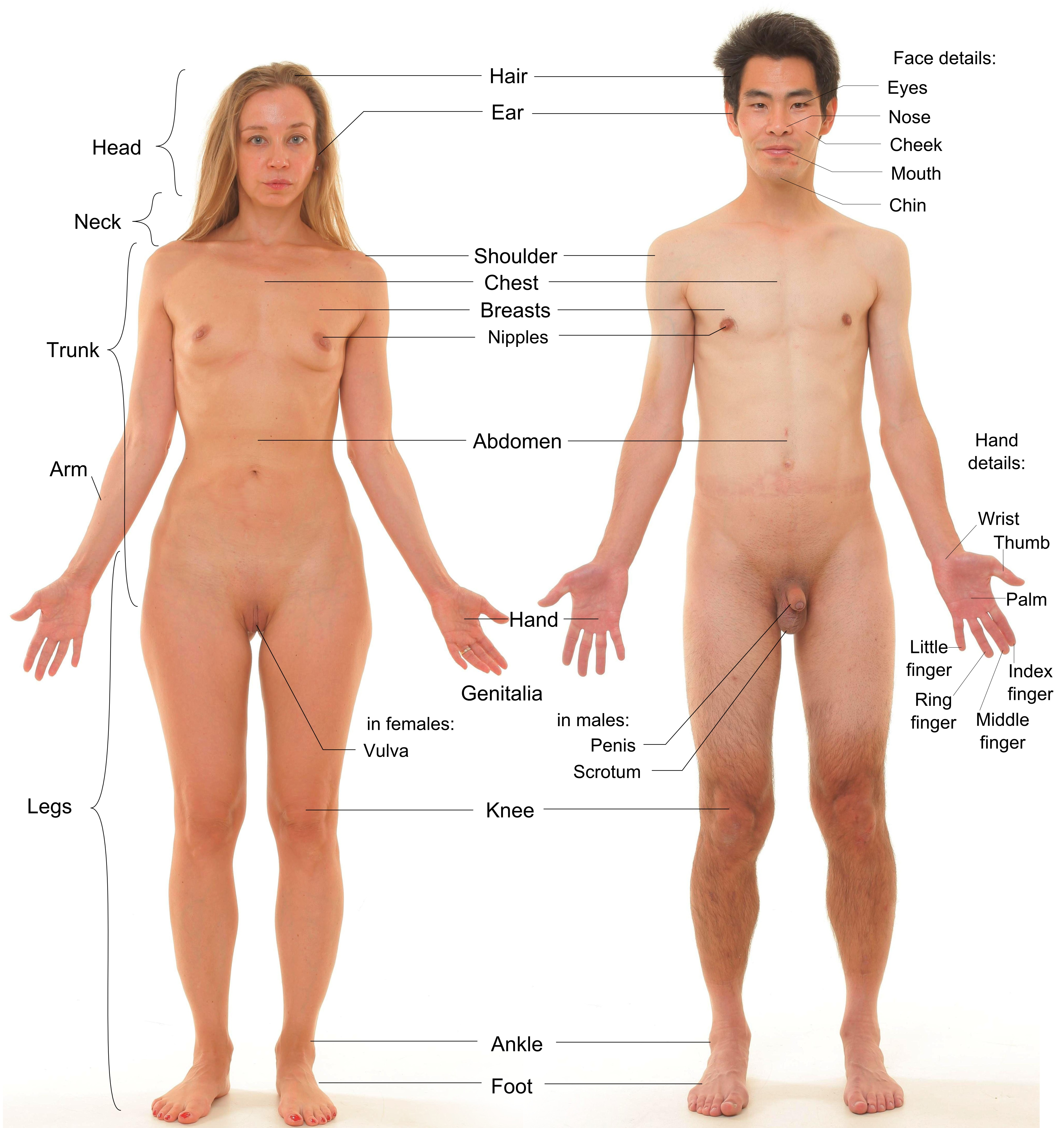
Superficial anatomy of female and male human body

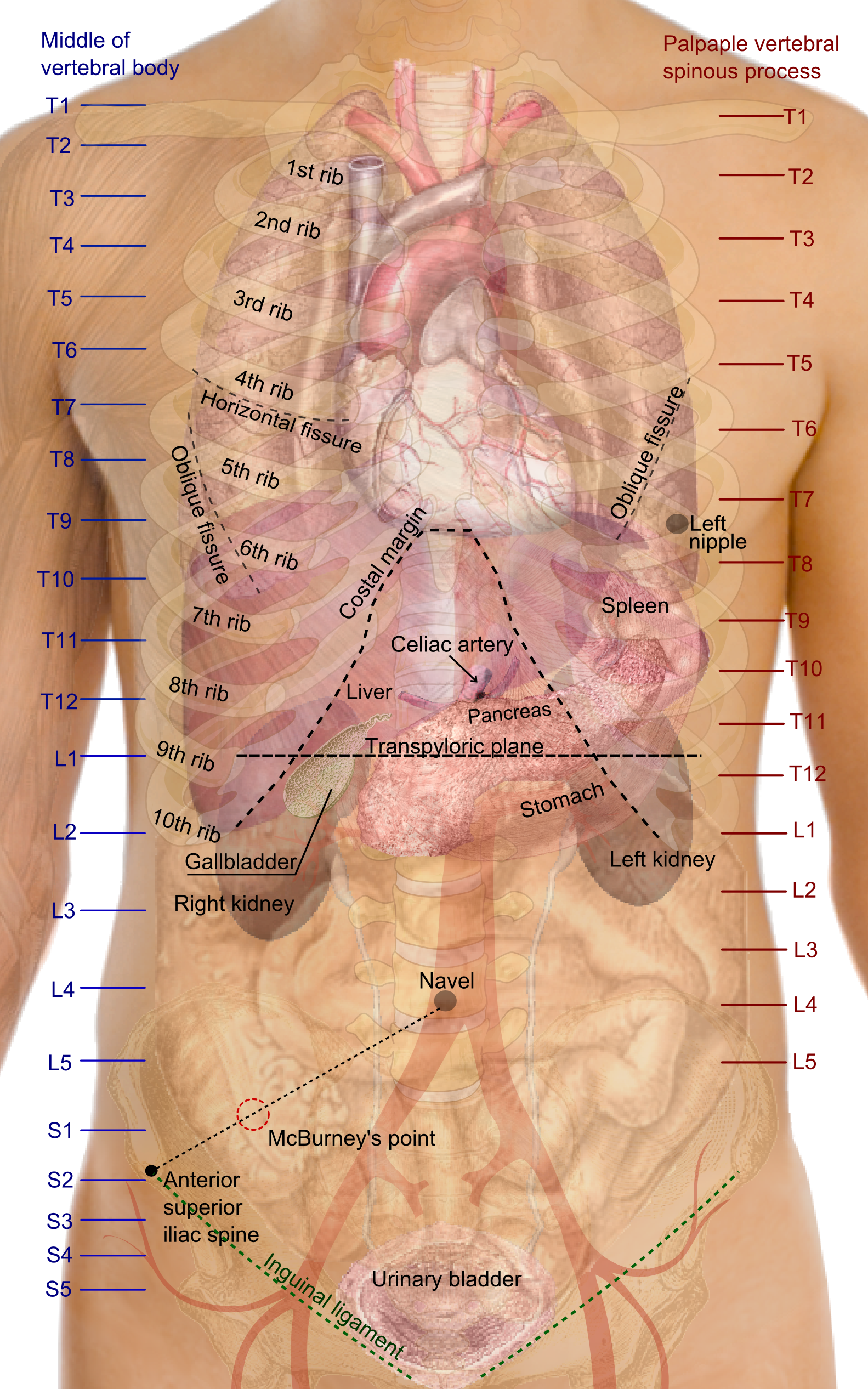
Surface projections of the major organs of the trunk, using the vertebral column and rib cage as main reference points of superficial anatomy

Surface anatomy, or superficial anatomy, is the study of anatomical landmarks that can be identified readily from the contours or other reference points on the surface of the body. It is important in human anatomy: with knowledge of superficial anatomy, physicians gauge the position and anatomy of deeper structures.

Common names of parts of the human body, from top to bottom:

- Head – face – forehead – jaw – cheek – chin
- Neck – shoulder
- Arm – elbow – wrist – hand – finger – thumb
- Spine – chest
- Abdomen – groin
- Hip – buttocks – leg – thigh – knee – calf – ankle – foot – heel – toe
- Eyes, ears, nose, mouth, teeth, tongue, throat, Adam's apple, breasts, penis, scrotum, vulva, and navel are also superficial structures.

== See also ==
- Anatomic variation
- Anatomy
- Body orifices
- Death
- Human
- Human biology
- Human body
- List of human anatomical features
- List of human anatomical parts named after people
- List of bones of the human skeleton
- List of distinct cell types in the adult human body
- List of muscles of the human body
- List of regions in the human brain
- Terminologia Anatomica
- Terms for anatomical location
- Visible Human Project
