= Renal column =

Extension of the cortex into the medulla

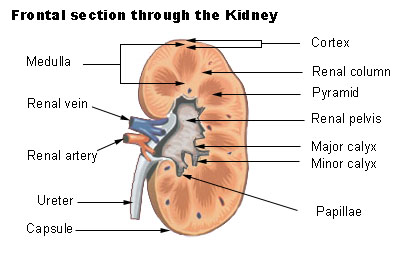
- Kidney

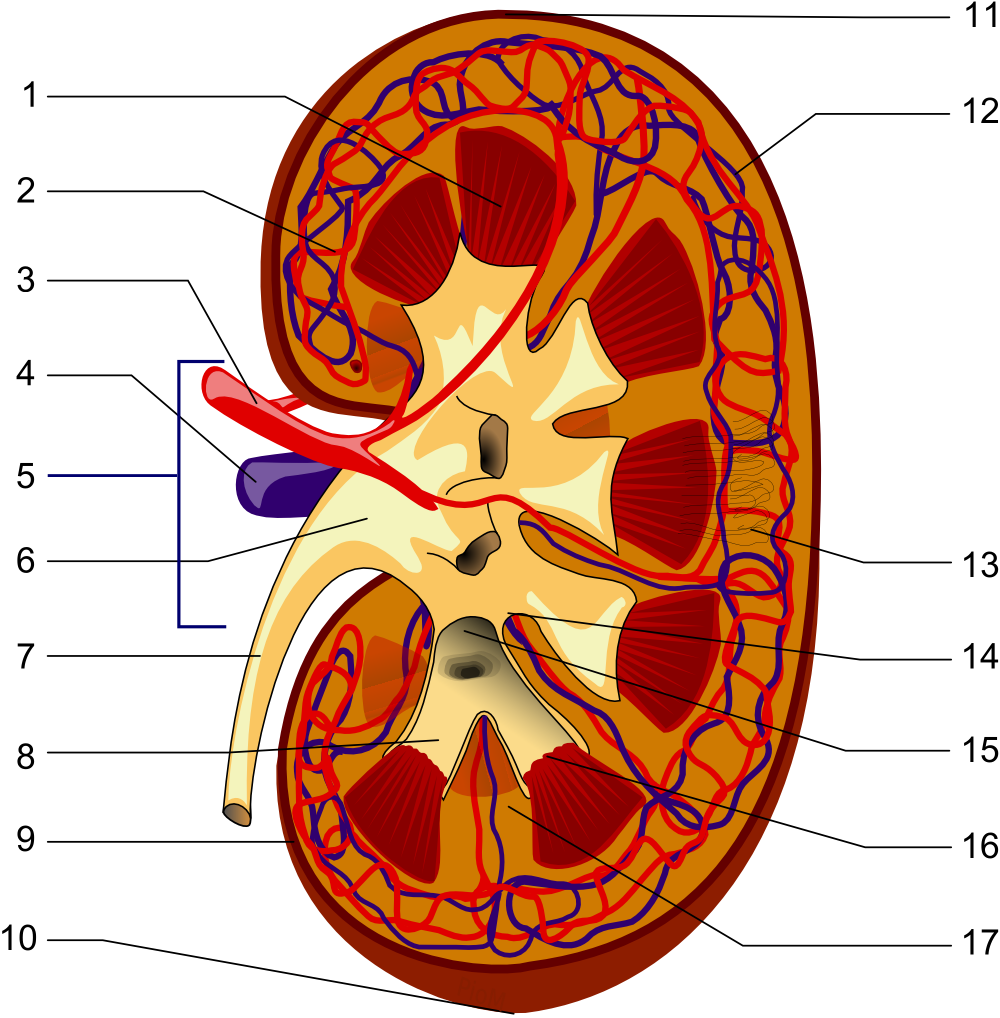
- 1. Renal pyramid; 2. Interlobular artery; 3. Renal artery; 4. Renal vein; 5. Renal hilum; 6. Renal pelvis; 7. Ureter; 8. Minor calyx; 9. Renal capsule; 10. Inferior renal capsule; 11. Superior renal capsule; 12. Interlobar veins; 13. Nephron; 14. Renal sinus; 15. Major calyx; 16. Renal papilla; 17. Renal column (of Bertin)

Details
- System: Urinary system

Identifiers
- Latin: columnae renales
- TA98: A08.1.01.019
- TA2: 3370
- FMA: 17633

The renal columns, Bertin columns, columns of Bertin, or columnae bertini are extensions of the renal cortex in between the renal pyramids. They allow the cortex to be better anchored. (Cortical extensions into the medullary space.)

Each column consists of lines of blood vessels and urinary tubes and a fibrous material.

A hypertrophied renal column (or renal pseudotumor) may be differentiated from an actual renal tumor with the help of a DMSA scan. The scan will show the area as one with normal activity if it is a pseudotumor or will show decreased uptake if it is a cystic or solid renal mass.

== History ==
Initially described by, and subsequently named after 18th-century French anatomist Exupere Joseph Bertin.

== Additional images ==
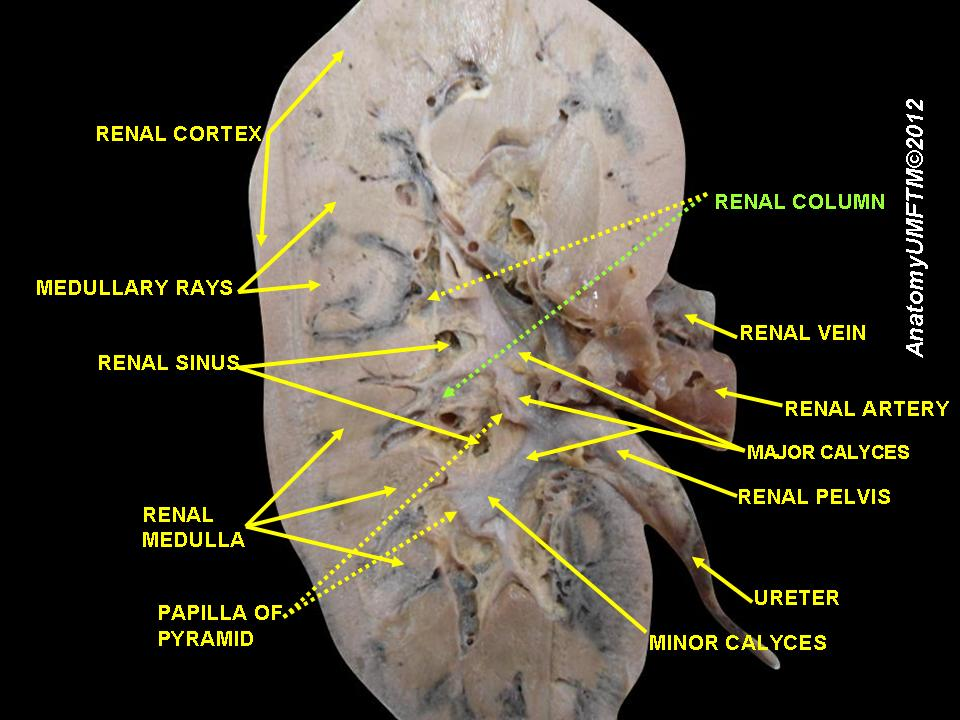
Renal column

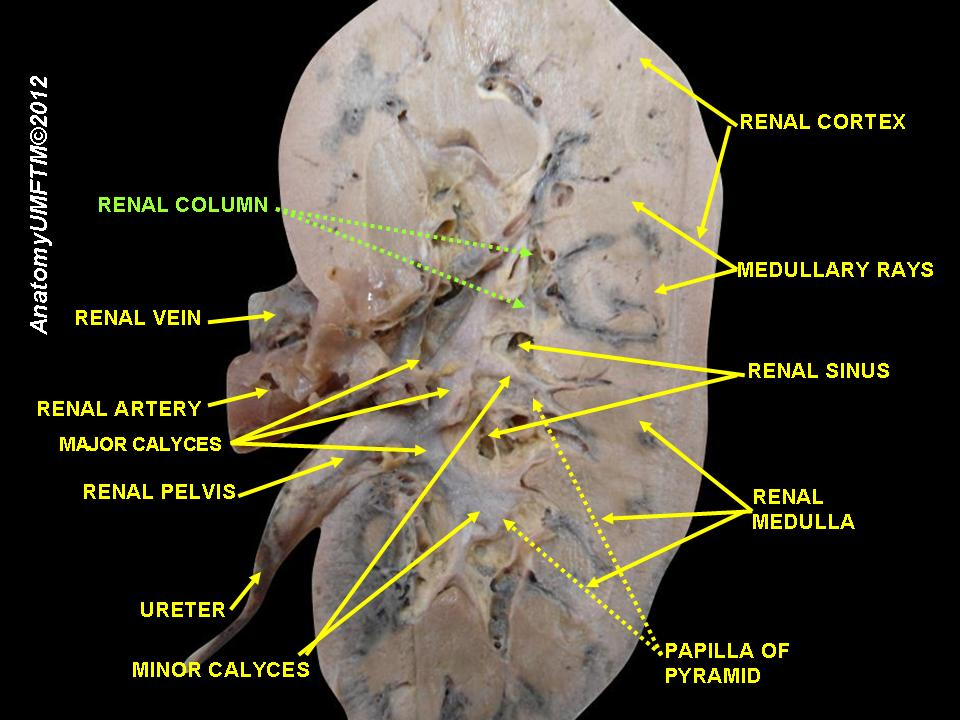
Renal column

== See also ==
- Renal pyramids
- Renal papilla
- Renal medulla
