= Thomas Lauth =

French anatomist (1758–1826)

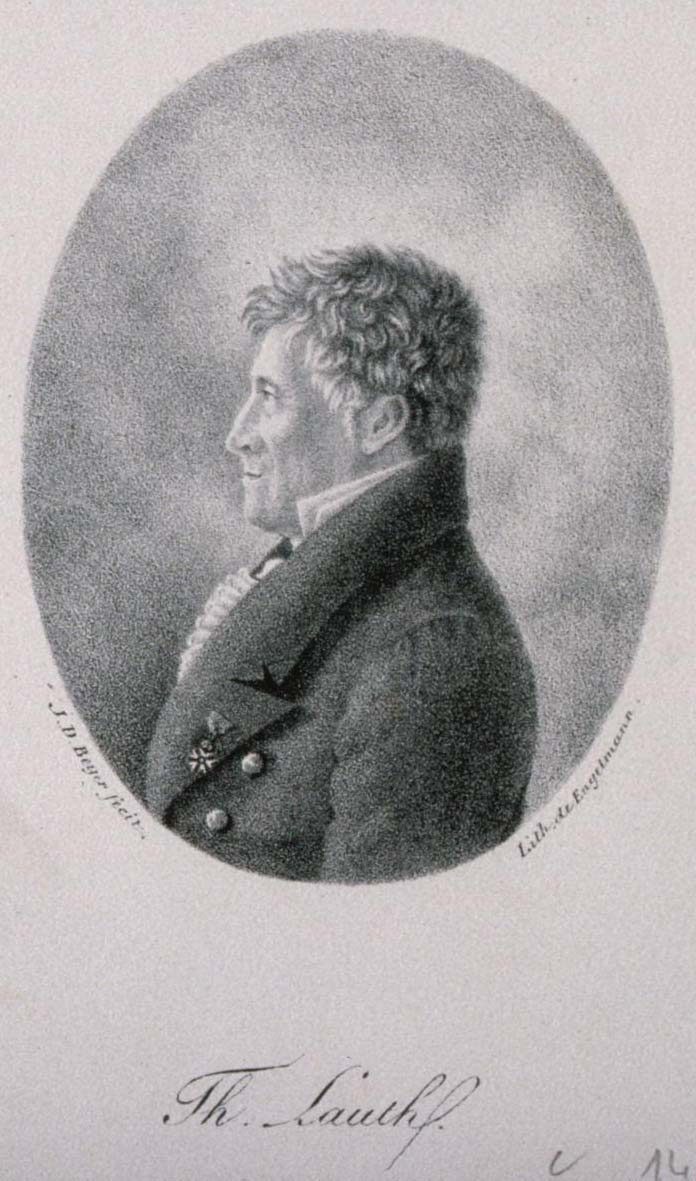
Thomas Lauth (1825) – Coll. BNUS.

Thomas Lauth (19 August 1758, Strasbourg – 16 September 1826) was a French anatomist. He was the father of anatomist Ernest Alexandre Lauth (1803–1837).

== Background ==
He studied philosophy, mathematics, science and medicine at the University of Strasbourg, receiving his doctorate in 1781. After graduation, he continued his medical studies in Paris with Pierre-Joseph Desault (1738-1795), and in London with John Hunter (1728-1793). Following his return to Strasbourg he worked as an obstetrical adjunct. In 1785 he was appointed a full professor of anatomy and surgery in Strasbourg. In 1794, with the creation of the Ecole de Santé, his post became the chair of anatomy and physiology, and in 1808 it was renamed as the chair of normal and pathological anatomy.

== Anatomical eponyms ==
- "Lauth's canal": Also known as the "sinus venosus sclerae".
- "Lauth's ligament": Also known as the transverse ligament of the atlas.

== Written works ==
- Dissertatio inauguralis botanica de Acere, 1781 - monograph on the genus Acer.
- Scriptorum Latinorum de aneurysmatibus collectio, 1785
- Nosologia chirurgica, 1788 - Surgical nosology.
- Elemens de myologie et de syndesmologie, 1798 - Elements of myology and syndesmology.
- Histoire de l'anatomie, 1815 - History of anatomy.
- De l'esprit de l'instruction publique, 1816.
