= Pars flaccida of tympanic membrane =

Part of the eardrum

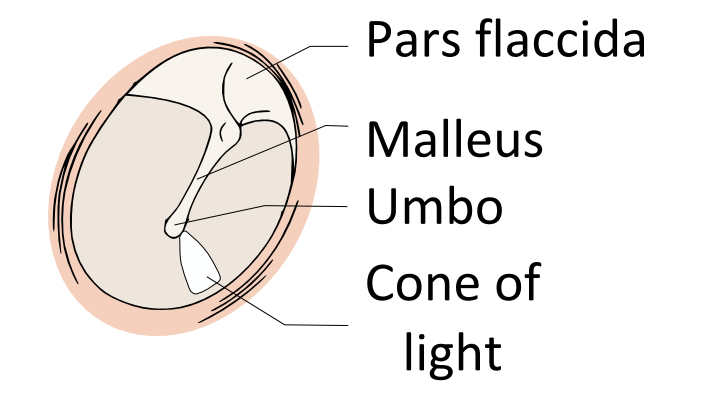
- Right tympanic membrane as seen through a speculum.

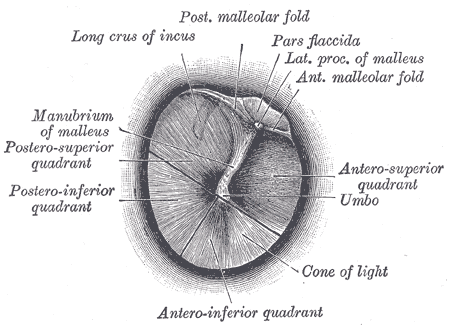
- Right tympanic membrane as seen through a speculum.

Details

Identifiers
- Latin: pars flaccida membranae tympanicae
- TA98: A15.3.01.053
- TA2: 6871
- FMA: 56721

In human anatomy, the pars flaccida of tympanic membrane or Shrapnell's membrane (also known as Rivinus' ligament) is the small, triangular, flaccid portion of the tympanic membrane, or eardrum. It lies above the malleolar folds attached directly to the petrous bone at the notch of Rivinus. On the inner surface of the tympanic membrane, the chorda tympani crosses this area.

The name Shrapnell's membrane refers to Henry Jones Shrapnell, and the name Rivinus' ligament to Augustus Quirinus Rivinus.
