= Frieda Lauth =

South African botanical artist

- Born: 1879; London
- Died: 1949, May, 4 Durban
- Citizenship: South Africa
- Occupation: Botanical artist

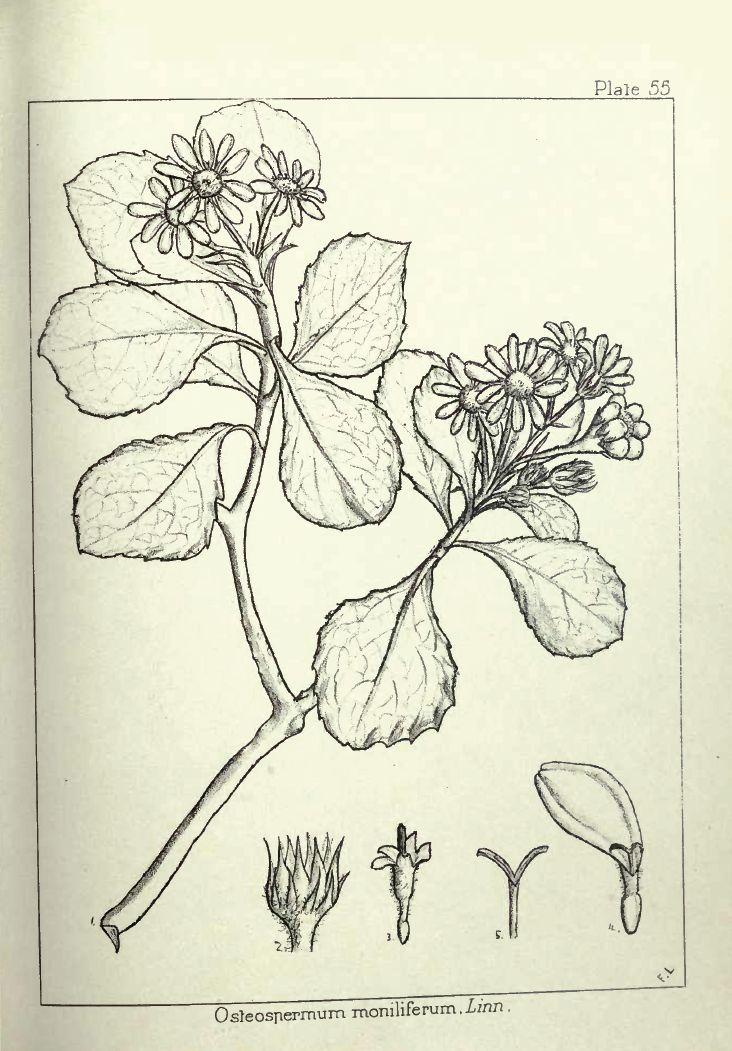
Chrysanthemoides monilifera Plate 55 from Natal Plants

Frieda Lauth (1879 London – 4 May 1949 Durban) was a South African botanical artist who emigrated to Natal with her parents in 1882. She worked as an assistant at the Natal Herbarium and is noted for her illustrations of Medley Wood's Natal Plants. She resigned in 1903 upon marrying Thomas Floyd, and later lectured in botany at the Durban Technical College.
