= Valve of coronary sinus =

Fold in the interior lining of the right atrium of the heart

Valve of the coronary sinus
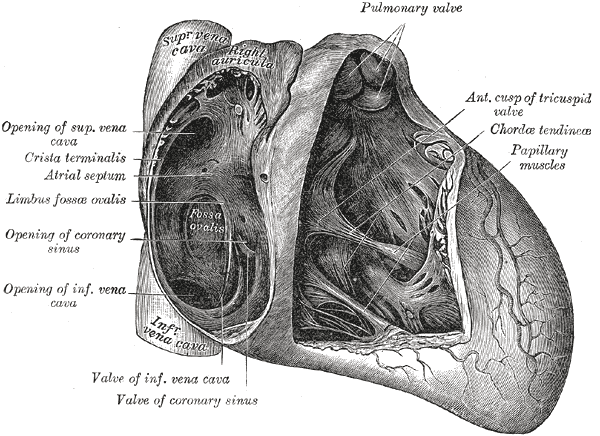
- Interior of right side of heart. (Valve of the coronary sinus labeled at bottom left.)

Details

Identifiers
- Latin: valvula sinus coronarii
- TA98: A12.1.01.016
- TA2: 4030
- FMA: 9242

In the anatomy of the heart, the valve of the coronary sinus (also called the Thebesian valve, after Adam Christian Thebesius) is a valve located at the orifice of the coronary sinus where the coronary sinus drains into the right atrium. It prevents blood from flowing backwards into the coronary sinus during contraction of the heart.

== Anatomy ==
The valve of the coronary sinus is a thin, semilunar (half-moon-shaped) valve located on the anteroinferior part of the opening into the right atrium. It is formed by a semicircular fold of the lining membrane of the right atrium. It is situated at the base of the inferior vena cava.

=== Variation ===
The valve may be completely absent; it is present in 73-86% of individuals.

The valve may vary in size. It may be double, or it may be cribriform (containing numerous small holes).

== Function ==
The valve prevents regurgitation of blood into the sinus during systole (i.e. the contraction of the atrium).
