= Valve of inferior vena cava =

Anatomical structure

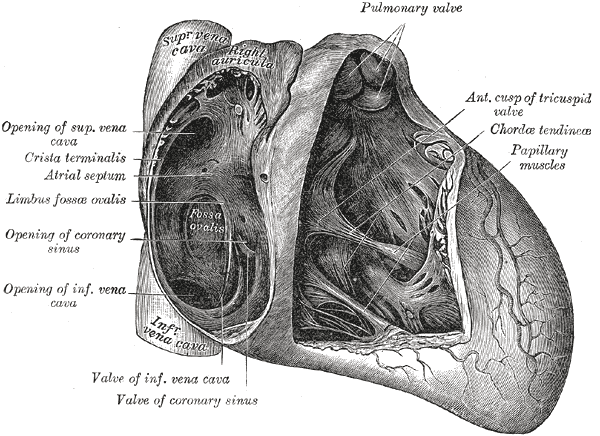
- Interior of right side of heart. (Valve of inf. vena cava labeled at lower left.)

Details

Identifiers
- Latin: valvula venae cavae inferioris
- TA98: A12.1.01.015
- TA2: 4032
- FMA: 9240

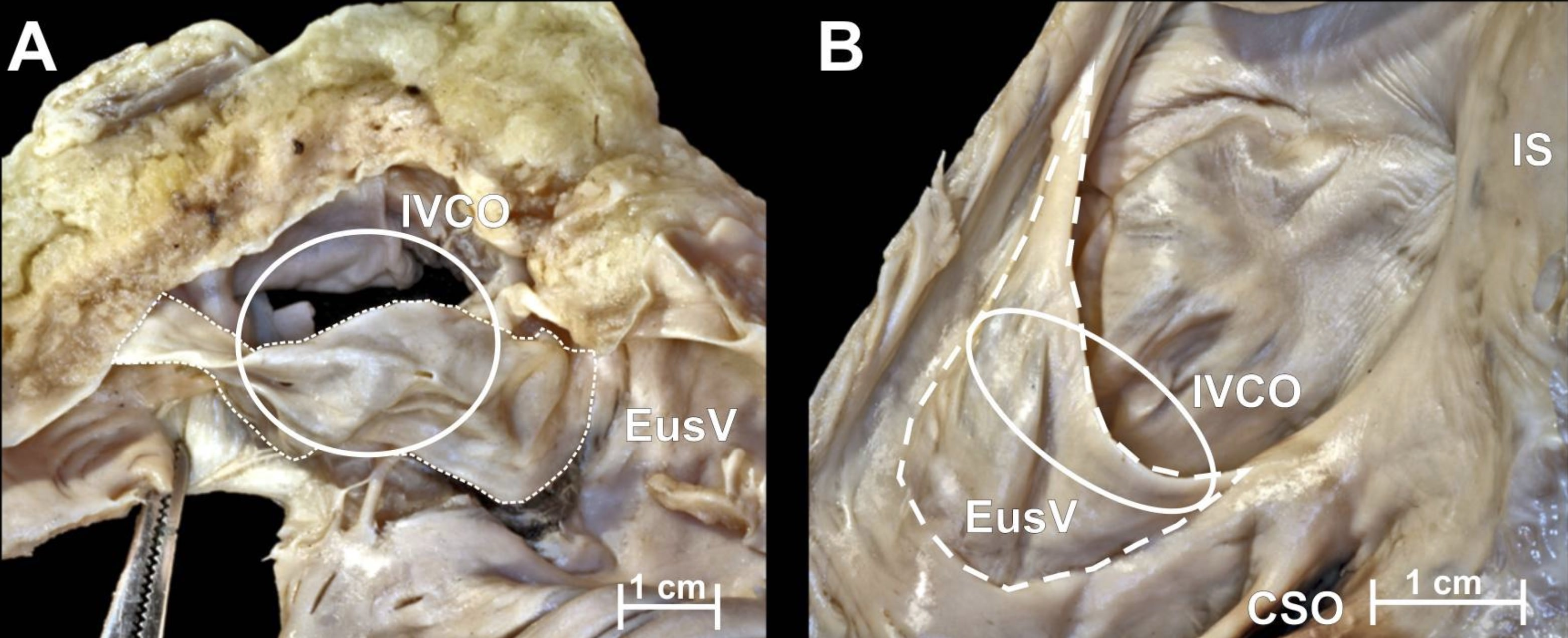
View of the inferior vena cava ostium (IVCO) with Eustachian valve (EusV) present in a human heart.

The valve of the inferior vena cava (Eustachian valve) is a venous valve that lies at the junction of the inferior vena cava and right atrium.

== Development ==
In prenatal development, the eustachian valve helps direct the flow of oxygen-rich blood through the right atrium into the left atrium and away from the right ventricle. Before birth, the fetal circulation directs oxygen-rich blood returning from the placenta to mix with blood from the hepatic veins in the inferior vena cava. Streaming this blood across the atrial septum via the foramen ovale increases the oxygen content of blood in the left atrium. This in turn increases the oxygen concentration of blood in the left ventricle, the aorta, the coronary circulation and the circulation of the developing brain.

Following birth and separation from the placenta, the oxygen content in the inferior vena cava falls. With the onset of breathing, the left atrium receives oxygen-rich blood from the lungs via the pulmonary veins. As blood flow to the lungs increases, the amount of blood flow entering the left atrium increases. When the pressure in the left atrium exceeds the pressure in the right atrium, the foramen ovale begins to close and limits the blood flow between the left and right atrium. While the eustachian valve persists in adult life, it essentially does not have a specific function after the gestational period.

== Variation ==
There is a large variability in size, shape, thickness, and texture of the persistent eustachian valve, and in the extent to which it encroaches on neighboring structures such as the atrial septum. At one end of the spectrum, the embryonic eustachian valve disappears completely or is represented only by a thin ridge. Most commonly, it is a crescentic fold of endocardium arising from the anterior rim of the IVC orifice. The lateral horn of the crescent tends to meet the lower end of the crista terminalis, while the medial horn joins the thebesian valve, a semicircular valvular fold at the orifice of the coronary sinus. At the other extreme, it persists as a mobile, elongated structure projecting several centimeters into the right atrial cavity. In this case, it may demonstrate an undulating motion in real time echocardiography; and when it is quite large, it may be confused with right atrial tumors, thrombi, or vegetations. Occasionally, the eustachian valve crosses the floor of the right atrium from the orifice of the IVC and inserts into the lower portion of the interatrial septum adjacent to the atrioventricular valves. However, higher insertion of a giant eustachian valve, which mimics the echocardiographic appearance of divided right atrium, is very rare. This type of abnormality may be confused with cor triatriatum dexter. Very rarely, such a configuration of a large eustachian valve may mimic a right atrial cystic tumor.

The superior vena cava (SVC) does not have any homologous valve or valvule.

== Clinical significance ==
The eustachian valve is frequently seen with transthoracic echocardiography from the parasternal long axis, the apical four-chamber and the sub-costal four-chamber views. The eustachian valve is better seen with transesophageal echocardiography in the bi-caval view and right sided horizontal and longitudinal views.

Association between the eustachian valve and patent foramen ovale has been studied in patients with cryptogenic stroke (stroke of unknown cause).

== History ==
The eustachian valve, also called valvula venae cavae inferioris, was described for the first time by the Italian anatomist Bartolomeo Eustachi (born between 1500 and 1513, died 1574).
