= Syndromes affecting the heart =

A syndrome is a set of medical signs and symptoms that are correlated with each other. A syndrome can affect one or more of body systems. Different syndromes affect different groups of organs. This is a list of syndromes that may affect the heart. Syndromes affecting primarily the heart are written in bold letters.

Syndrome	Cause	cardiac signs and symptoms	Other symptoms or organs affected	Notes
1q21.1 deletion syndrome	genetic (Chromosome 1)	Cardiovascular anomalies are present in 30% of the cases (for example anomalous origin of the coronary artery in "Class II-deletion")	TAR syndrome; Neuropsychiatric; Craniofacial abnormalities; Eye; Kidney	
DiGeorge syndrome	genetic (Chromosome 22)	commonly interrupted aortic arch, truncus arteriosus and tetralogy of Fallot	Craniofacial; Thymic aplasia; Cleft palate; Hypocalcemia/hypoparathyroidism	
Acute coronary syndrome		Commonly associated with three clinical manifestations: ST elevation myocardial infarction (STEMI, 30%), non ST elevation myocardial infarction (NSTEMI, 25%), or unstable angina (38%)		Blockage of a coronary artery
Adams–Nance syndrome	maybe disturbance in glycine metabolism	persistent tachycardia, paroxysmal hypertension	Seizure; Eye (Microphthalmia, Cataract)	
Alagille syndrome	genetic (Autosomal dominant inheritance: loss of function mutations in either JAG1 or NOTCH2)	Congenital heart problems e.g. pulmonary artery stenosis (common), Tetralogy of Fallot, overriding aorta, ventricular septal defect; and right ventricular hypertrophy.	Liver (jaundice, pruritus, hepatosplenomegaly, acholia, xanthoma)	
Andersen–Tawil syndrome				This condition affects the QT interval (in blue)
Antley–Bixler syndrome				
Barth syndrome				
Brugada syndrome				
Cantú syndrome	genetic (Chromosome 12, autosomal dominant)			
Cardiac syndrome X				
Cardiorenal syndrome			Kidney	
Cat eye syndrome				
CHARGE syndrome				
Coffin–Lowry syndrome	genetic (RPS6KA3 gene mutation, Chromosome X)			
Costello syndrome				
Down syndrome	genetic (Chromosome 21)			
Dressler syndrome	autoimmune inflammatory reaction secondary to MI.			
Edwards syndrome	genetic (Chromosome 18)			
Eisenmenger's syndrome				
Ellis–van Creveld syndrome				
Emanuel syndrome				
HEC syndrome				
Heyde's syndrome				
Ho–Kaufman–Mcalister syndrome				
Holt–Oram syndrome		ASD, and a first degree heart block.		
Hypoplastic left heart syndrome				
Jacobsen syndrome	genetic (Chromosome 11q deletion)			
Jaffe–Campanacci syndrome				
Jervell and Lange-Nielsen syndrome	genetic (autosomal recessive)			a type of long QT syndrome
Kabuki syndrome				
Kearns–Sayre syndrome				
Long QT syndrome				
Lutembacher's syndrome				
Malpuech facial clefting syndrome				
Marden–Walker syndrome				
Marfan syndrome				
McKusick–Kaufman syndrome				
McLeod syndrome				
Noonan syndrome				
Noonan syndrome with multiple lentigines				
Ortner's syndrome				
Bouveret Hoffmann syndrome				another name for "Paroxysmal tachycardia"
Patau syndrome	genetic (Chromosome 13)			
Pre-excitation syndrome				
Romano–Ward syndrome				
Scimitar syndrome				
Shone's syndrome				
Short QT syndrome				
Sick sinus syndrome				
Taussig–Bing syndrome		double outlet right ventricle (DORV) and subpulmonic VSD.		a cyanotic congenital heart defect
Timothy syndrome				
Townes–Brocks syndrome				
Triploid syndrome				
Turner syndrome				
VACTERL syndrome				
Wellens' syndrome				
Williams syndrome				
Wolff–Parkinson–White syndrome				A Delta wave often seen in an affected individual
Zunich–Kaye syndrome				
Lown–Ganong–Levine syndrome				
