= Progressive cardiac conduction defect =

- Other names: Familial Lenègre disease, Familial Lev disease, Familial Lev-Lenègre disease, Familial PCCD, Familial progressive heart block, Progressive familial heart block, Hereditary bundle branch defect
- Specialty: Cardiology

Progressive cardiac conduction defect (PCCD) is a hereditary cardiac condition marked by a progressive delay in impulse conduction via the His-Purkinje system, resulting in right or left bundle branch block (RBBB or LBBB), syncope, and occasionally sudden cardiac death.

== Diagnosis ==
When progressive conduction abnormalities in people under 50 with structurally normal hearts are present but skeletal myopathies are absent, progressive cardiac conduction defect is primarily diagnosed, particularly if there is a family history of PCCD.

== Treatment ==
At the moment, implanting an implantable pacemaker is the only proven treatment for PCCD, regardless of the underlying cause.
