= Moderator band =

Muscle band in the right ventricle of the heart

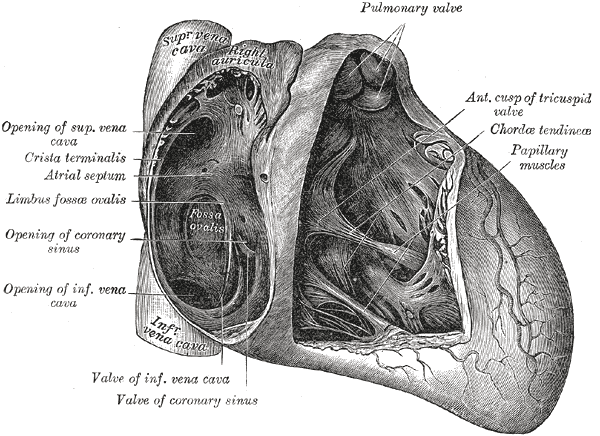
- Interior of right side of heart. (Septomarginal trabecula visible at bottom right, but not labeled.)

Details

Identifiers
- Latin: trabecula septomarginalis
- TA98: A12.1.02.020
- TA2: 4050
- FMA: 7272

The moderator band (also known as septomarginal trabecula) is a structure located in the right ventricle of the heart. The moderator band consists of conductive tissue branching off of the right bundle branch (within the ventricular septum) and wrapped in working cardiac muscle. Depending on the location of the anterior papillary muscle, the moderator band can range from readily apparent to difficult to discern.

== Embryology ==
Much of the conduction system develops from the primary ring of the primitive heart. As the heart is developing and the ventricular septum has not formed, there is one inflow tract, a common ventricle where LV flows into RV, then one outflow tract. The primary ring is a band of specialized tissue that wraps around the middle of this common ventricle and, as the heart twists during development, develops into the His bundle, bundle branches, atrioventricular rings, and the moderator band. It is possible that the moderator band influences the position of the anterior papillary muscle as the papillary muscle develops off of the septal wall. During early development as the primary ring is dividing with the twisting of the heart, there exists a circuit between atrioventricular rings and right bundle branch. It is thought that these conductive cells apoptose and this circuit disappears in the developed heart. More about this in the Clinical Significance section.

== Structure ==
The moderator band is located in the right ventricle. It consists of conductive tissue branching off the right bundle branch, wrapped in working muscle tissue. It connects to the base of the anterior papillary muscle. If the anterior papillary muscle is farther from the ventricular septum, the moderator band is likely to be more visible whereas an anterior papillary muscle closer to the septum leads to a less visible moderator band.

== Function ==
The moderator band is important because it carries part of the right bundle branch of the atrioventricular bundle of the conduction system of the heart to the anterior papillary muscle. This shortcut is significant for two reasons. One is that it helps to ensure equal conduction time in the left and right ventricles, allowing for coordinated contraction of the anterior papillary muscle. The second function of this connection involves the disparity between the right and left ventricular muscle. The left ventricle pumps to the entire body while the right ventricle pumps only to the lungs, the myocardium in the left ventricle is much larger and can create much stronger contraction. Because of this difference, as the heart contracts, there’s a possibility of the left ventricle pulling on the right ventricle and lowering the contractibility of the right ventricular muscle. To offset this, the moderator band allows the right ventricle to tense before the left ventricle contracts, so that the left ventricle does not pull on the right ventricle in an adverse manner.

== Clinical significance ==
The moderator band is often used by radiologists and obstetricians to more easily identify the right ventricle in prenatal ultrasound. The moderator band is also thought to play a significant role in Mahaim tachycardia, caused by Mahaim fibers. Mahaim tachycardia is a arrhythmia of the heart caused by an accessory pathway in the right ventricle. Specifically, it is believed that the accessory pathway in question is a remnant of the connection from the primitive moderator band to the atrioventricular ring of conductive tissue that lays within the vestibule of the tricuspid valve. If the conductive tissue that exists in the primitive heart as an extension of the moderator band, connectng right atrioventricular ring with right bundle branch, fails to apoptose and develop into working muscle, an accessory circuit will remain in the adult heart and these are referred to as Mahaim fibers. This accessory circuit consisting of the right bundle branch, moderator band, Mahaim fibers, into right atrium via right atrioventricular ring and connecting to the atrioventricular node is what is thought to cause Mahaim tachycardia.

== History ==
From its attachments it was thought to prevent overdistension of the ventricle, and was named the "moderator band". It was first described by Leonardo da Vinci in his exploration of human anatomy.

== Additional images ==
Location of the moderator band

== See also ==
- Trabecula
