= Das Reizleitungssystem des Säugetierherzens =

1906 scientific monograph on the heart

Das Reizleitungssystem des Säugetierherzens (English: "The Conduction System of the Mammalian Heart") is a scientific monograph published in 1906 by Sunao Tawara. It has been recognized by cardiologists as a monumental discovery, and a milestone in cardiac electrophysiology".

The monograph revealed the existence of the atrioventricular node and the function of Purkinje cells. It was used by Arthur Keith and Martin Flack as a detailed guide in their attempts to verify the existence of the Bundle of His, which subsequently led to their discovery of the sinoatrial node. Throughout the beginning of the 20th century, Tawara's monograph influenced the work of many cardiologists and it was later cited by Willem Einthoven in his anatomical interpretation of the electrocardiogram.

== Background ==
Prior to Tawara's discoveries, it was assumed that electrical conduction through the Bundle of His was slow, because of the long interval between atrial and ventricular contractions. The Swiss cardiologist Wilhelm His, Jr. assumed that the heart bundle was connected directly to the base of the ventricle, and physiologists incorrectly taught that the base of the ventricle contracted first, followed by the apex.

However, Tawara postulated that ventricular contraction occurs in the opposite manner, with the apex contracting earlier than the base. He also believed that the heart's electrical conduction was not slow but rapid. Working under the guidance of his mentor, Ludwig Aschoff, Tawara performed a histological examination of 150 hearts with myocarditis (which led to the discovery of Aschoff bodies), and he began examining the atrioventricular bundle before embarking on a comprehensive study of the anatomy and histology of the heart's conduction system.

The implications of his work were immediately recognized by Aschoff, who arranged for it to be published in the form of a monograph.

== Discoveries ==
Tawara's monograph, titled "Das Reizleitungssystem des Säugetierherzens" (English: "The Conduction System of the Mammalian Heart") was published in 1906. The most important discoveries are listed below:

1. The Bundle of His is divided into 2 bundle branches that are connected with a fanlike group of “subendocardially scattered characteristic muscular bundles”.
2. Purkinje cells act as a pathway for the "atrioventricular connecting system".
3. The atrioventricular connecting system starts in the atrioventricular node, moves into the fibrocartilaginous portion of the septum (Bundle of His), divides into defined left and right bundle branches, and descends into the terminal ends of the Purkinje fibers.

Tawara commented that the system represents a transporting or conducting pathway, and "because the pathway is not a ductal, but a continuously related protoplasmic cord, conduction of excitation impulses surely must take place there."

== Influences ==
On 26 September 1905, shortly before the monograph was due to be published, Ludwig Aschoff wrote an article about Tawara's work. It was subsequently read by the Scottish cardiologist James Mackenzie and forwarded to anatomist Arthur Keith, who was attempting to confirm the existence of the Bundle of His. Despite putting in his best efforts, he failed to locate the structure. On 15 January 1906, Keith wrote a letter to Mackenzie and acknowledged his skepticism about its existence: "I have given up the search for His' bundle—having come to the conclusion that there is not and never was any such thing.”

Verification of the Bundle of His (1906)

In response to Arthur Keith's skepticism, Mackenzie forwarded Aschoff's article about Tawara's findings, which stimulated Keith's renewal of his studies on the cardiac conduction system. Despite having written a letter to The Lancet about his failure to locate the Bundle of His and his increasing doubts about its existence, Keith (with his student Martin Flack) later reported that they had succeeded in locating the structure by following the detailed descriptions and figures in Tawara's monograph. In a paper published in The Lancet on 11 August 1906, they acknowledged the monograph's high degree of accuracy:

"We take this opportunity of clearly stating that although some of our observations are new our work is in the main but a verification of the accurate and complete monograph published recently by Tawara, a Japanese working in the laboratory of Professor Aschoff of Marburg."

Discovery of the sinoatrial node (1907)

Encouraged by their initial success and inspired by Tawara's discovery of the atrioventricular node, Keith and Flack extended their studies and eventually discovered the sinoatrial node in 1907. They wrote that they were examining other regions of the heart for "peculiar musculature" similar to the one discovered by Tawara.

Theoretical basis for the electrocardiogram (1908)

In 1908, the Dutch physiologist Willem Einthoven referred to Tawara’s monograph as the anatomical basis for interpreting the electrocardiogram. In his monograph, Tawara theorized about the velocity of the excitatory process in the conduction system and the mode of ventricular contraction. Together with his anatomic findings and physiological assumptions, it contributed to the rapid popularization of electrocardiography.

Other influences and reviews

In 1909, the American pathologist Lydia DeWitt created the first 3D wax model of the conduction system, using Tawara’s description as a guide. In 1911, the British cardiologist Thomas Lewis reviewed the auriculo-ventricular connection system and described Tawara's discoveries in Das Reizleitungssystem des Saugetierherzens as the "main advance" in knowledge about the system:

"The main advance was made by Tawara, working under the direction of Aschoff. In his book, Das Reizleitungssystem des Saugetierherzens, a complete account of the junctional tissues was given, and the anatomy of the whole system and the connections with the network of Purkinje were described in great detail and in many species of animals. These observations upon the anatomy have received complete confirmation by the more recent writings."

In his autobiography published in 1950, Arthur Keith explained how he had systematically searched for Tawara's system to verify its components:

"I was able in heart after heart to verify the existence of Tawara’s system. The auricles, I found, were joined to the ventricles by an elaborate system which, beginning in a root like structure in the auricular septum, ended as an arborescence in the ventricles. The ‘bundle of His’ was but a small segment of the Tawara system."

Acknowledging the significance and implications of these discoveries, Keith commented: "With the discovery of the conducting system of Tawara, heart research entered a new epoch."

Shortly before his death, Wilhelm His, Jr. published a personal account about the discovery of the Bundle of His. He noted that it took ten years before anatomists began to pay attention to the bundle, starting with the studies of Retzer and Brauning in 1903, followed by the "important work of Tawara" in 1906, and the subsequent discovery of the sinus node which completed the system. He credited Tawara for connecting the bundle with the Purkinje fibers and for declaring it the heart's conduction system.

== See also ==
- Electrical conduction system of the heart
