= Dario DiFrancesco =

Italian physiologist (born 1948)

Dario DiFrancesco (born 10 February 1948) is a Professor Emeritus (Physiology) at the University of Milano. In 1979, he and collaborators discovered the so-called "funny" (or "pacemaker") current in cardiac pacemaker cells, a new mechanism involved in the generation of cardiac spontaneous activity and autonomic regulation of heart rate. That initiated a new field of research in the heart and brain, where hyperpolarization-activated, cyclic nucleotide-gated (HCN) channels, the molecular components of "funny" channels cloned in the late 90's, are today known to play fundamental roles in health and disease. Clinically relevant exploitation of the properties of "funny" channels has developed a channel blocker with specific heart rate-slowing action, ivabradine, marketed for the therapy of coronary artery disease, heart failure and the symptomatic treatment of chronic stable angina.

Dario DiFrancesco is the 2008 recipient of the Grand Prix scientifique de la Fondation Lefoulon-Delalande of the Institute de France.

== Biography ==
After post degree studies (1973, Biophysics - Biology, Summa-cum-laude) at the University of Milano, DiFrancesco joined in 1976 first the Physiological Laboratory in Cambridge and then, from 1977 to 1980, the Oxford Laboratory of Physiology, working with Denis Noble's team. Here, he and collaborators first described the "funny" (I_{f}, or "pacemaker", or hyperpolarization-activated) current, proposing a new theory for the generation of spontaneous activity of the heart and adrenaline-induced rhythm acceleration. The discovery of the "funny" current and the new proposal of a cardiac pacemaking model raised keen interest in the scientific community and was followed by a fast-increasing number of studies investigating its properties. These studies eventually led to developments of pharmacological and clinical relevance. As well as in cardiomyocytes, it opened a new field of research in neurons, where a similar current (hyperpolarization activated I_{h}) was described soon after the cardiac I_{f}.

=== The funny current and the new interpretation of cardiac pacemaking ===
By identifying in 1979 the I_{f} ("funny") pacemaker current in the sinus node, Dario DiFrancesco challenged the prevailing theory and proposed a novel mechanism to explain the origin of cardiac rhythm. Based on the discovery of the new "funny" channels, carrying an inward (mixed Na^{+} and K^{+}) current and activating on hyperpolarization, he modified the concept of cardiac pacemaking by demonstrating that the universally accepted "pacemaker" theory of the time, attributed to the deactivation of an outward potassium current (I_{K2}) in Purkinje fibres, was wrong and had to be turned upside-down. He showed that I_{K2} had been incorrectly interpreted for over a decade as a pure K^{+} current and was instead a disguised "funny" current, and pacemaking was not due to deactivation of the outward I_{K2}, but to activation of the inward I_{f}. These results showed that the mechanism of pacemaker generation in Purkinje fibres and in sinoatrial node cells was the same, allowing for the first time an integrated view of pacemaking in the heart. Following the discovery of I_{f}, DiFrancesco published several studies demonstrating its permeability and gating characteristics, its involvement in the autonomic rate control, and investigated its single-channel properties, providing first evidence for the smallest conductance (1 pS) channel recorded by patch-clamp. Using a macro-patch clamp technique, he showed for the first time that funny channels are directly activated by intracellular cAMP, a mechanism responsible for the I_{f} -mediated autonomic modulation of heart rate. The same modulatory mechanism was later confirmed in HCN channels. These experimental studies have been complemented by mathematical and modelling analyses demonstrating the role of I_{f} in pacemaker rhythm. In 1985, he developed with Denis Noble a theoretical model incorporating the I_{f} -based model of pacemaking and other new experimental results. The model allowed to interpret all experimental data, and represented the paradigm from which subsequent cellular models of the heart were developed. The 1985 model paper was selected in 2015 by the Royal Society, London, as one of the 33 most influential articles published by the Philosophical Transactions of the Royal Society in the 350 years since its foundation in 1665.

=== HCN channels ===
Following their cloning, DiFrancesco contributed to the molecular biological characterization of the hyperpolarization-activated, cyclic nucleotide-gated (HCN) family of channels responsible for I_{f}, analyzing their biochemical and pharmacological regulations. A blocker of the funny/HCN channels (ivabradine) approved in 2005 has proved efficacious in the treatment of coronary artery disease and heart failure by reducing cardiac frequency (and hence metabolic demand). HCN channels have also been identified as potential drug targets in the nervous system, which can help develop new ivabradine-derived drugs to treat neurological diseases like epilepsy, inflammatory, and neuropathic pain. Beyond heart and brain, HCN channels are in fact expressed in a much larger number of systems/organs than previously thought, where their action is still under investigation and where development of HCN isoform-specific drugs could help clarify their functional roles.

== Career ==
- 1973–1974 - Teaching and research fellowship, Institute of General Physiology, Univ. Milano
- 1975–1980 - Research assistant, Institute of General Physiology, Univ. Milano
- 1976 - Postdoctoral fellow in Cambridge, The Physiological Laboratory (R.D. Keynes)
- 1977–1978 - Postdoc in cardiac electrophysiology in Oxford, Laboratory of Physiology (Denis Noble)
- 1979–1980 - Wellcome Trust Fellowship at Oxford University Laboratory of Physiology
- From 1978 - Visiting scientist for short periods in various university laboratories of physiology (Homburg/Saar, Paris XI, Tours)
- 1981–1986 - Assistant professor, Dept. of General Physiology and Biochemistry, Univ. Milano
- From 1986 - Periodically, visiting scientist at SUNY - Stony Brook, New York (Ira Cohen)
- 1986–2018 - Professor of physiology, Department of General Physiology and Biochemistry, then Department of Biosciences, University of Milano
- 1990–1996 - Periodically, visiting scientist and consultant, Department of Pharmacology of Columbia University, New York (Richard Robinson, Mike Rosen)
- From 1999 - Professor of physiology and biophysics at Vita-Salute University, San Raffaele Hospital, Milano
- From 2019 - Emeritus professor (physiology), University of Milan

== Publications ==
Dario DiFrancesco's publication list includes more than 380 articles in academic journals including Nature, Science, Journal of Physiology, Journal of General Physiology, PNAS, Progress in Biophysics & Molecular Biology, Circulation, Circulation Research, New England Journal of Medicine, Journal of Molecular and Cellular Cardiology, European Heart Journal and others.

DiFrancesco's h-index is 78 and the number of citations is higher than 22000 (Google Scholar, 07/2022). He has delivered more than 220 talks to invited presentations/congresses/named lectures. He is a member of the Academia Europaea, of the Istituto Lombardo- Accademia di Scienze e Lettere and a Fellow of the IUPS Academy.

== Awards and honours ==
- 1976 - Accademia dei Lincei - Royal Society award (Cambridge - Oxford)
- 1977–1979 - Wellcome Trust award Research Grants (Oxford)
- 1980 and 1983 - Wallace O. Fenn Memorial Fund Award XXVIII IUPS Congress (Budapest) and XXIX IUPS Congress (Sydney)
- 1992 - Member of the "Academia Europaea"
- 1994 - Prix Pr Pierre Rijlant Académie royale de Médecine de Belgique
- 1994 - Lectio Magistralis Annual Congress Italian Society of Physiology
- 2008 - Grand Prix Scientifique, Fondation Lefoulon-Delalande - Institut de France
- 2013 - Member of the "Istituto Lombardo- Accademia di Scienze e Lettere"
- 2013 - Lectio Magistralis Annual Congress Italian Society of Physiology
- 2015 - Magnes Lecture Prize, Israel Society of Physiology and Pharmacology
- 2015 - Emeritus Membership of the American Physiological Society
- 2017 - Carmeliet-Coraboeuf-Weidmann Prize Lecture at 41st EWGCCE Congress, Vienna
- 2017 - Fellow Membership Physiological Society UK
- 2019 - Emeritus Professor, University of Milano
- 2021 - Elected a Fellow of the International Union of Physiological Sciences (IUPS) Academy
