= Diastolic depolarization =

In mammals, cardiac electrical activity originates from specialized myocytes of the sinoatrial node (SAN) which generate spontaneous and rhythmic action potentials (AP). The unique functional aspect of this type of myocyte is the absence of a stable resting potential during diastole. Electrical discharge from this cardiomyocyte may be characterized by a slow smooth transition from the Maximum Diastolic Potential (MDP, -70 mV) to the threshold (-40 mV) for the initiation of a new AP event. The voltage region encompassed by this transition is commonly known as pacemaker phase, or slow diastolic depolarization or phase 4.

The duration of this slow diastolic depolarization (pacemaker phase) thus governs the cardiac chronotropism. It is also important to point out that the modulation of the cardiac rate by the autonomic nervous system also acts on this phase. Sympathetic stimuli induce the acceleration of rate by increasing the slope of the pacemaker phase, while parasympathetic activation exerts the opposite action.

The amount of net inward current required to move the cell membrane potential during the pacemaker phase is extremely small, in the order of few pAs, but this net flux arises from the time to time changing contribution of several currents that flow with different voltage and time dependence. Evidence in support of the active presence of K^{+}, Ca^{2+} , Na^{+} channels and Na^{+}/K^{+} exchanger during the pacemaker phase have been variously reported in the literature, but several indications point to the funny current (I_{f}) as one of the most important. There is now substantial evidence that also sarcoplasmic reticulum (SR) Ca^{2+} -transients participate in the generation of the diastolic depolarization via a process involving the Na–Ca exchanger.

== See also ==
- Funny current
