= Bachmann's bundle =

Anatomical cardiac structure

- Image showing Bachmann's bundle

In the heart's conduction system, Bachmann's bundle (also called the Bachmann bundle or the interatrial band) is a branch of the anterior internodal tract that resides on the inner wall of the left atrium. It is a broad band of cardiac muscle that passes from the right atrium, between the superior vena cava and the ascending aorta. Bachmann's bundle is, during normal sinus rhythm, the preferential path for electrical activation of the left atrium. It is therefore considered to be part of the "atrial conduction system" of the heart.

== History ==
In 1916, Jean George Bachmann conducted canine experiments. He found that clamping the muscular bundle of fibers that connects the atria caused a significant conduction delay.

== Structure ==
Bachmann's bundle receives its blood supply from the sinoatrial nodal artery (right, left or both).

Besides Bachmann's bundle, the other three conduction tracts that constitute the atrial conduction system are known as the anterior, middle, and posterior tracts, which run from the sinoatrial node to the atrioventricular node, converging in the region near the coronary sinus. Atrial automaticity foci are within the atrial conduction system. The concentration of converging conduction tracts near the coronary sinus results in considerable automaticity activity originating in that area.

== Function ==
The normal cardiac rhythm originates in the sinoatrial node, which is located in the right atrium near the superior vena cava. From there, the electrical activation spreads throughout the right atrium. There are at least four locations where the activation can pass to the left atrium. Apart from Bachmann's bundle these are the anterior interatrial septum, posterior interatrial septum, and the coronary sinus. Because it originates close to the sinoatrial node and consists of long parallel fibers, Bachmann's bundle is, during sinus rhythm, the first of these connections to activate the left atrium.

== See also ==
- Bundle of His
