= IKF =

IKF may refer to:

- International Kabaddi Federation
- International Kart Federation
- International Kendo Federation
- International Kickboxing Federation
- International Korfball Federation
- International N. D. Kondratiev Foundation, a Russian economic research organization
- Isiah Kiner-Falefa (born 1995), American baseball player
- Pacemaker current of the heart, I_{Kf}
