= Ivabradine =

Heart medication

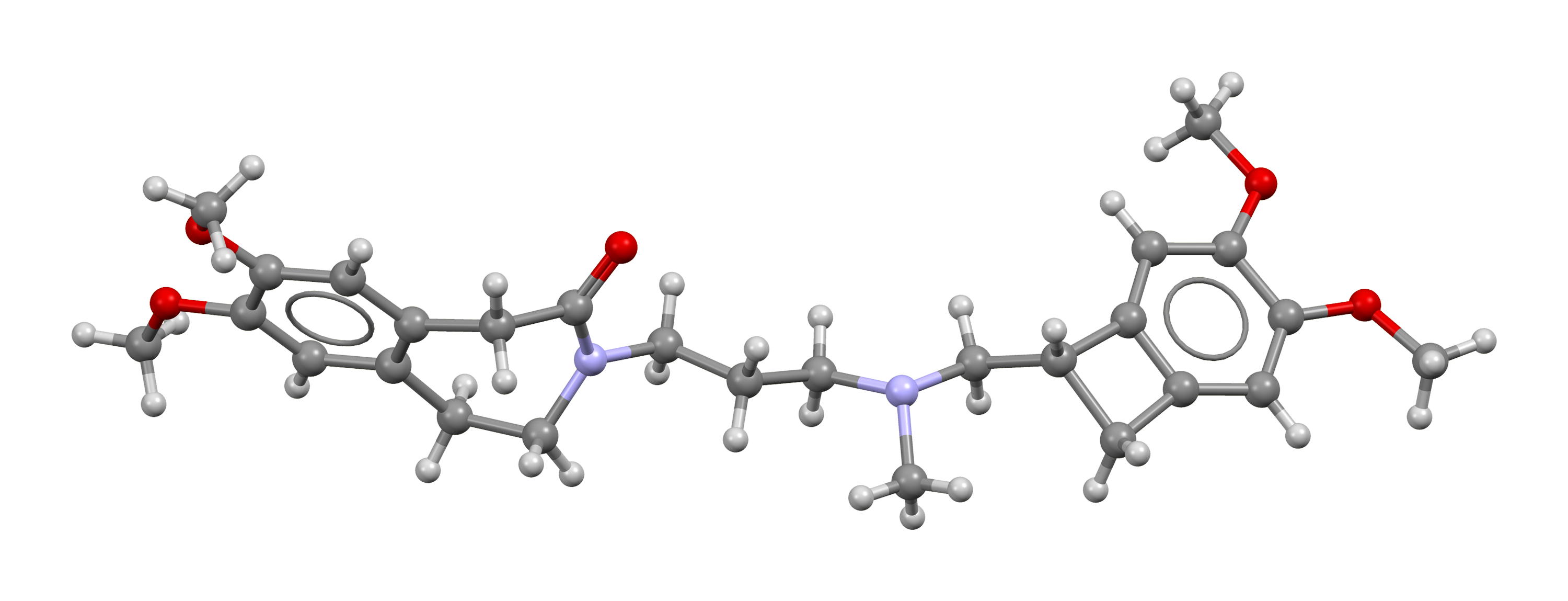

Clinical data
- Pronunciation: /ɪˈvæbrədiːn/
- Trade names: Corlanor, Procoralan, others
- Other names: S-16257
- AHFS/Drugs.com: Monograph
- MedlinePlus: a615027
- License data: US DailyMed: Ivabradine
- Routes of administration: By mouth
- ATC code: C01EB17 (WHO) C07FX05 (WHO), C07FX06 (WHO)

Legal status
- Legal status: CA: ℞-only; UK: POM (Prescription only); US: ℞-only; EU: Rx-only

Pharmacokinetic data
- Bioavailability: 40%
- Protein binding: 70%
- Metabolism: Liver (first-pass) >50%, CYP3A4-mediated
- Elimination half-life: 6 hours
- Excretion: Kidney and fecal

Identifiers
- IUPAC name: 3-[3-({[(7S)-3,4-dimethoxybicyclo[4.2.0]octa-1,3,5-trien-7-yl]methyl}(methyl)amino)propyl]-7,8-dimethoxy-2,3,4,5-tetrahydro-1H-3-benzazepin-2-one
- CAS Number: 155974-00-8
- PubChem CID: 132999
- IUPHAR/BPS: 2357
- DrugBank: DB09083
- ChemSpider: 117373
- UNII: 3H48L0LPZQ
- KEGG: D07165
- ChEBI: CHEBI:85966
- ChEMBL: ChEMBL471737
- CompTox Dashboard (EPA): DTXSID2048240

Chemical and physical data
- Formula: C_{27}H_{36}N_{2}O_{5}
- Molar mass: 468.594 g·mol^{−1}
- 3D model (JSmol): Interactive image
- SMILES: O=C2N(CCc1cc(OC)c(OC)cc1C2)CCCN(C[C@@H]4c3cc(OC)c(OC)cc3C4)C
- InChI: InChI=1S/C27H36N2O5/c1-28(17-21-11-20-14-25(33-4)26(34-5)16-22(20)21)8-6-9-29-10-7-18-12-23(31-2)24(32-3)13-19(18)15-27(29)30/h12-14,16,21H,6-11,15,17H2,1-5H3/t21-/m1/s1; Key:ACRHBAYQBXXRTO-OAQYLSRUSA-N

Ivabradine, sold under the brand name Procoralan among others, is a medication, which is a pacemaker current (I_{f}) inhibitor, used for the symptomatic management of heart-related chest pain and heart failure. Patients who qualify for use of ivabradine for congestive heart failure are patients who have symptomatic heart failure, with reduced ejection fraction, and heart rate at least 70 bpm, and the condition not able to be fully managed by beta blockers.

Ivabradine acts by inducing negative chronotropy in the sinoatrial structure, thus reducing the heart rate via specific inhibition of the pacemaker current. It operates by a mechanism different from that of beta blockers and calcium channel blockers, which are two commonly prescribed antianginal classes of cardiac drugs. Ivabradine has no apparent inotropic properties and may be a cardiotonic agent.

== Medical uses ==
It is used for the symptomatic treatment of chronic stable angina pectoris in patients with normal sinus rhythm who cannot take beta blockers. It is also being used off-label in the treatment of inappropriate sinus tachycardia (IST). Ivabradine stands as a pharmacological option for controlling HR and rhythm without associated side effects in postoperative CABG patients with IST.

=== Chest pain ===
Ivabradine is as effective as the beta blocker atenolol and comparable with amlodipine in the management of chronic stable angina, as demonstrated by improvements in total exercise duration in non-inferiority trials, hence it can be an alternative therapy for those who cannot tolerate conventional therapies. In people not sufficiently managed with beta blockers for their angina, adding ivabradine can further reduce heart rate and improve total exercise duration.

=== Heart failure ===
It is used in combination with beta blockers in people with heart failure with LVEF lower than 35 percent inadequately controlled by beta blockers alone and whose heart rate exceeds 70 beats per minute. In people not sufficiently managed with beta blockers for their heart failure adding ivabradine decreases the risk of hospitalization for heart failure.

=== Tachycardia ===
The clinical use of ivabradine is predicated on its mechanism of action on sinoatrial nodal tissue where it selectively inhibits the funny current (I_{f}) and results in a decrease in heart rate.

Ivabradine's most frequent application in electrophysiology is for the treatment of inappropriate sinus tachycardia. Its use for inappropriate sinus tachycardia is not a European Medicines Agency or Food and Drug Administration approved indication for ivabradine.

Ivabradine has shown success as an off-label treatment for postural orthostatic tachycardia syndrome (POTS) and is also being used experimentally in patients who developed POTS after contracting COVID-19.

== Contraindications ==
Ivabradine is contraindicated in sick sinus syndrome. It should also not be used concomitantly with potent inhibitors of CYP3A4, including azole antifungals (such as ketoconazole), macrolide antibiotics, nefazodone and the antiretroviral drugs nelfinavir and ritonavir.

Use of ivabradine with verapamil or diltiazem is contraindicated.

== Adverse effects ==
Overall, 14.5% of patients taking ivabradine experience luminous phenomena (by patients described as sensations of enhanced brightness in a fully maintained visual field). This is probably due to blockage of I_{h} ion channels in the retina, which are very similar to cardiac I_{f}. These symptoms are mild, transient, and fully reversible. In clinical studies, about 1% of all patients had to discontinue the drug because of these sensations, which occurred on average 40 days after the drug was started.

In a large clinical trial, bradycardia (unusually slow heart rate) occurred in 2% and 5% of patients taking ivabradine at doses of 7.5 and 10 mg respectively (compared to 4.3% in those taking atenolol). Headaches were reported in 2.6–4.8% of cases. Other common adverse drug reactions (1–10% of patients) include first-degree AV block, ventricular extrasystoles, dizziness and/or blurred vision.

== Mechanism of action ==
Ivabradine acts on the I_{f} (f is for "funny", so called because it had unusual properties compared with other current systems known at the time of its discovery) ion current, which is highly expressed in the sinoatrial node. I_{f} is a mixed Na^{+}–K^{+} inward current activated by hyperpolarization and modulated by the autonomic nervous system. It is one of the most important ionic currents for regulating pacemaker activity in the sinoatrial (SA) node. Ivabradine selectively inhibits the pacemaker I_{f} current in a dose-dependent manner. Blocking this channel reduces cardiac pacemaker activity, selectively slowing the heart rate and allowing more time for blood to flow to the myocardium. By inhibiting the I_{f} channel, ivabradine reduces the heart rate and workload on the heart. This is relevant in the usage of the medication to treat angina as well as congestive heart failure. This is in contrast to other commonly used rate-reducing medications, such as beta-blockers and calcium channel blockers, which not only reduce heart rate, but also the cardiac contractility. Given the selective decrease in rate without loss of contractility, ivabradine may prove efficacious for treatment of congestive heart failure with reduced ejection fraction.

Ivabradine binds to HCN4 receptors (potassium/sodium hyperpolarization-activated cyclic nucleotide-gated channel 4), utilizing Y506, F509 and I510 residues.

== Clinical trials ==
=== Coronary artery disease ===
The BEAUTIFUL study randomised over 10,917 patients having stable coronary artery disease and left ventricle dysfunction (ejection fraction < 40%). Ivabradine did not show a significant reduction in the primary composite endpoint of cardiovascular death, admission to hospital for acute myocardial infarction, and admission to hospital for new onset or worsening heart failure. However, in a prespecified subgroup of patients with a baseline heart rate of more than 70 bpm, ivabradine significantly reduced the following secondary endpoints:

- Coronary events by 22% (P=0.023)
- Fatal and nonfatal myocardial infarction by 36% (P=0.001)
- Coronary revascularization by 30% (P=0.016).

These results were seen in combination therapy with beta blockers, and were found to be safe and effective in improving coronary artery disease outcomes in patients with heart rates of 70 bpm or more.

The SIGNIFY trial randomised 19,102 patients with stable coronary artery disease and an elevated heart rate greater than 70 beats per minute were assigned to an intervention of ivabradine or placebo in addition to standard therapy. Ivabradine did not significantly improve the secondary outcomes in patient groups, however did demonstrate a reduction in heart rate. When compared to the SHIFT study, a reduction in cardiovascular death or hospital admission was also demonstrated and hence should be considered when additional therapy is in question.

=== Chronic heart failure ===
In the SHIFT study, ivabradine significantly reduced the risk of the primary composite endpoint of hospitalization for worsening heart failure or cardiovascular death by 18% (P<0.0001) compared with placebo on top of optimal therapy. These benefits were observed after 3 months of treatment. SHIFT also showed that administration of ivabradine to heart failure patients significantly reduced the risk of death from heart failure by 26% (P=0.014) and hospitalization for heart failure by 26% (P<0.0001). The improvements in outcomes were observed throughout all prespecified subgroups: female and male, with or without beta-blockers at randomization, patients below and over 65 years of age, with heart failure of ischemic or non-ischemic etiology, NYHA class II or class III, IV, with or without diabetes, and with or without hypertension. A 2020 Cochrane review found no difference in cardiovascular mortality and serious adverse events between long-term treatment with ivabradine and placebo/usual care/no treatment in participants with heart failure with a reduced ejection fraction.

A note of caution must be emphasised. Ivabradine, though indicated for chronic heart failure in patients who are clinically stable, is not indicated in acute heart failure where the enhanced heart rate represents cardiac reserve. Indiscriminate use of Ivabradine could destabilise these patients.

== Society and culture ==
=== Approval ===
Ivabradine was approved by the European Medicines Agency in 2005, and by the United States Food and Drug Administration in 2015.

=== Alleged conflict of interest ===
According to a documentary and article of the Danish media channel TV2 in September 2024, a former president of the European Society of Cardiology during 2006-2008, professor Kim Fox, had a conflict of interest in relation to clinical trials of ivabradine and his recommendation of ivabradine based on the trials. According to TV2, Fox and his partner founded a company, Heart Research Ltd., which performed clinical trials and received payments from the pharmaceutical industry, allowing them to extract a total profit of 500 million DKK (67 million euro) during 2003-2015, mostly from a cooperation with the French pharmaceutical company Servier which is also known for the Mediator scandal. According to TV2's research of financial statements of the company, in the period of 2004-2006, the couple received a salary of over 20 million DKK (2.7 million euro) from their company, while during the same period, Kim Fox was chairman of the taskforce recommending ivabradine, and as president of the European Society of Cardiology, he also had the role of presenting the research results and recommending ivabradine as a "gold standard" treatment at a European cardiological conference in 2008. Karsten Juhl Jørgensen, professor of medicine and conflict of interests expert at Odense University and the Nordic Cochrane Centre, commented that the conflict of interest was "probably the largest he had seen". Danish chief physician Niels Holmark Andersen commented that Fox's conflict of interest was of an "oligarchal magnitude" and "the mother of all conflicts of interests" because Fox was involved in all parts of the process, that the clinical results did not sustain claims of the superiority of the medication which has serious adverse effect, and further that Servier had marketed ivabradine "aggressively" and offered physicians exclusive trips to castles in France to promote the medication during the decade of 2000-2010.

=== Names ===
It is marketed by Amgen under the brand name Corlanor in the United States, and by Servier in the rest of the world under the brand names Procoralan (worldwide), Coralan (in Hong Kong, Singapore, Australia and some other countries), Corlentor (in Armenia, Spain, Italy and Romania), Lancora (in Canada) and Coraxan (in Russia and Serbia). It is also marketed in India under the brand names Ivabrad, Ivabid. In Iran it's sold under the brand name "bradix" . IVAMAC and Bradia. During its development, ivabradine was known as S-16257.
