= Bundle branches =

Electric conductors in heart ventricles

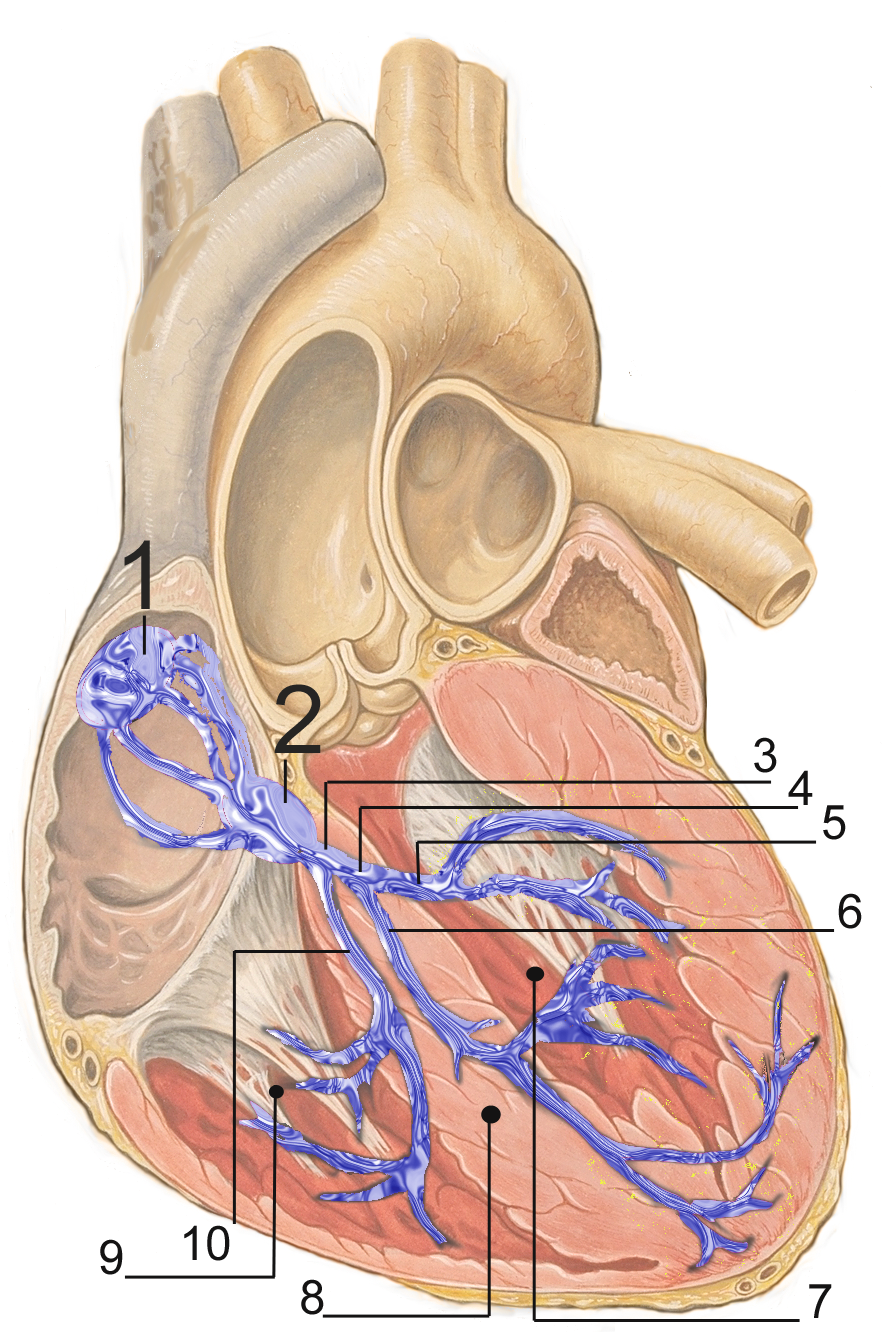
- The left bundle branch (4) and the right bundle branch (10)

The bundle branches, or Tawara branches, transmit cardiac action potentials (electrical signals) from the bundle of His to Purkinje fibers in heart ventricles. They are offshoots of the bundle of His and are important to the electrical conduction system of the heart.

== Structure ==
There are two branches of the bundle of His: the left bundle branch and the right bundle branch, both of which are located along the interventricular septum. The left bundle branch further divides into the left anterior fascicle and the left posterior fascicle. These structures lead to a network of thin filaments known as Purkinje fibers. They play an integral role in the electrical conduction system of the heart by transmitting cardiac action potentials to the Purkinje fibers.

== Clinical significance ==
When a bundle branch or their fascicles becomes injured (by underlying heart disease, myocardial infarction, or cardiac surgery), it may cease to conduct electrical impulses appropriately, resulting in altered pathways for ventricular depolarization. This condition is known as a bundle branch block.

== History ==
The bundle branches were separately described by Retzer and Braeunig as early as 1904, but their physiological function remained unclear and their role in the electrical conduction system of the heart remained unknown until Sunao Tawara published his monograph on Das Reizleitungssystem des Säugetierherzens (English: The Conduction System of the Mammalian Heart) in 1906. Although Tawara's monograph had demonstrated that the branches of the bundle of His may transmit cardiac action potentials to the ventricles, the functional proof for his observation was not provided until 1910, when Hans Eppinger and Carl Julius Rothberger showed that cutting off both branches to induce a bilateral bundle branch block results in a complete heart block.
