= Pacemaker current =

Electric current in the heart

The pacemaker current (I_{f}, or I_{Kf}, also called funny current) is an electric current in the heart that flows through the HCN channel or pacemaker channel. Such channels are important parts of the electrical conduction system of the heart and form a component of the natural pacemaker.

First described in the late 1970s in Purkinje fibers and sinoatrial myocytes, the cardiac pacemaker "funny" (I_{f}) current has been extensively characterized and its role in cardiac pacemaking has been investigated. Among the unusual features which justified the name "funny" are mixed Na^{+} and K^{+} permeability, activation on hyperpolarization, and very slow kinetics.

== Function ==
The funny current is highly expressed in spontaneously active cardiac regions, such as the sinoatrial node (SAN, the natural pacemaker region), the atrioventricular node (AVN) and the Purkinje fibres of conduction tissue. The funny current is a mixed sodium–potassium current that activates upon hyperpolarization at voltages in the diastolic range (normally from −60/−70 mV to −40 mV). When, at the end of a sinoatrial action potential, the membrane repolarizes below the I_{f} threshold (about −40/−50 mV), the funny current is activated and supplies inward current, which is responsible for starting the diastolic depolarization phase (DD); by this mechanism, the funny current controls the rate of spontaneous activity of sinoatrial myocytes, and thus the cardiac rate. The reversal potential of the funny current lies between -20 and -10 mV.

Another unusual feature of I_{f} is its dual activation by voltage and by cyclic nucleotides. Cyclic adenosine monophosphate (cAMP) molecules bind directly to f-channels and increase their open probability. cAMP dependence is a particularly relevant physiological property, since it underlies the I_{f}-dependent autonomic regulation of heart rate. Sympathetic stimulation raises the level of cAMP-molecules which bind to f-channels and shift the I_{f} activation range to more positive voltages; this mechanism leads to an increase of the current at diastolic voltages and therefore to an increase of the steepness of DD and heart rate acceleration.

Parasympathetic stimulation (which acts to increase probability of potassium channels opening but decreases the probability of calcium channel opening) decreases the heart rate by the opposite action, that is by shifting the I_{f} activation curve towards more negative voltages. When vagally-released acetylcholine (ACh) binds to muscarinic M2 receptors, this promotes dissociation of βγ subunit complexes, leading to direct opening of the G-protein–gated inwardly rectifying K+ channel (Girk/Kir) IKACh.

== Related currents ==
A similar current, termed I_{h} (hyperpolarization-activated), has also been described in different types of neurons, where it has a variety of functions, including the contribution to control of rhythmic firing, regulation of neuronal excitability, sensory transduction, synaptic plasticity and more.

== Molecular determinants ==
The molecular determinants of the pacemaker current belong to the HCN channel (hyperpolarization-activated cyclic nucleotide–gated channel), of which 4 isoforms (HCN1 to HCN4) are known. Based on their sequence, HCN channels are classified as members of the superfamily of voltage-gated K^{+} (Kv) and CNG channels.

== Clinical significance ==
Ivabradine

Because of their relevance to generation of pacemaker activity and modulation of spontaneous frequency, f-channels are natural targets of drugs aimed to pharmacologically control heart rate. Several agents called "heart rate reducing agents" act by specifically inhibiting f-channel function. Ivabradine is the most specific and selective I_{f} inhibitor and the only member of this family that is now marketed for pharmacological treatment of chronic stable angina in patients with normal sinus rhythm who have a contraindication or intolerance to beta-blockers. Recent studies have also indicated that funny channel inhibition can be used to reduce the incidence of coronary artery disease outcomes in a subgroup of patients with heart rate ≥70 bpm.

Cardiovascular diseases represent a major cause of worldwide mortality, and the relevance of the genetic component in these diseases has recently become more apparent. Genetic alterations of HCN4 channels (the molecular correlate of sinoatrial f-channels) coupled to rhythm disturbances have been reported in humans. For example, an inherited mutation of a highly conserved residue in the CNBD of the HCN4 protein (S672R) is associated with inherited sinus bradycardia. In vitro studies indicate that the S672R mutation causes a hyperpolarizing shift of the HCN4 channel open probability curve of about 5 mV in heterozygosis, an effect similar to the hyperpolarizing shift caused by parasympathetic stimulation and able to explain a reduction of inward current during diastole and the resulting slower spontaneous rate.

Biological pacemakers, generally intended as cell substrates able to induce spontaneous activity in silent tissue, represent a potential tool to overcome the limitations of electronic pacemakers. One of the strategies used to generate biological pacemakers involves the use of cells inherently expressing or engineered to express funny channels. Different types of stem cells can be used for this purpose.

== See also ==
- Pacemaker potential
- Cardiac pacemaker
- Cardiac action potential
