= Sunao Tawara =

Japanese pathologist

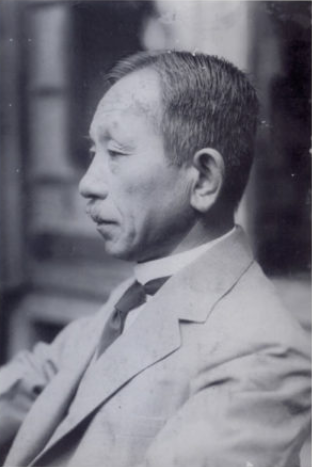
Sunao Tawara (1873-1952)

Sunao Tawara (田原 淳, Tawara Sunao; July 5, 1873 – January 19, 1952) was a Japanese pathologist known for the discovery of the atrioventricular node.

Tawara was born in Ōita Prefecture and studied at the Medical School, Imperial University of Tokyo in Tokyo, graduating in 1901 and receiving his Doctorate of Medical Science in 1908. Between 1903 and 1906 he spent in Philipps University of Marburg in Marburg, studying pathology and pathological anatomy with Ludwig Aschoff. It was here he undertook his important works on pathology and anatomy of heart. Upon returning to Japan he was appointed assistant professor of pathology at Kyushu Imperial University in Fukuoka, obtaining full professorship in 1908.

Node of Tawara: a remnant of primitive fibers found in all mammalian hearts at the base of the interauricular septum, and forming the beginning of the auriculoventricular bundle or bundle of His, which is a muscular band, containing nerve fibers, connecting the auricles with the ventricles of the heart. The Node of Tawara is also called the atrioventricular node, the auriculoventricular node, Aschoff's node, and the node of Aschoff and Tawara.

Tawara's monograph, "Das Reizleitungssystem des Säugetierherzens" (English: "The Conduction System of the Mammalian Heart") was published in 1906.

== Works ==
- Die Topographie und Histologie der Brückenfasern. Ein Beitrag zur Lehre von der Bedeutung der Purkinjeschen Fäden. (Vorläufige Mitteilung). Zentralblatt für Physiologie, Band 19, Nr. 3, 6. Mai 1905, S. 70-77
- Anatomisch-histologische Nachprüfung der Schnittführung an den von Prof. H. E. Hering übersandten Hundeherzen.. Archiv für die gesamte Physiologie des Menschen und der Tiere, Band 111, No 7-8, 20 February 1906, S. 300-302.
- Über die sogenannten abnormen Sehnenfäden des Herzens. Ziegler’s Beiträge zur Pathologischen Anatomie und zur allgemeinen Pathologie, Band 39, 1906, S. 563-584
- Das Reizleitungssystem des Säugetierherzens. Eine anatomisch-histologische Studie über das Atrioventrikularbündel und die Purkinjeschen Fäden. Jena:Gustav Fischer, 1906
- Die heutige Lehre von den pathologisch-anatomischen Grundlagen der Herzschwäche: kritische Bemerkungen auf Grund eigener Untersuchungen. (mit L. Aschoff). Jena: Fischer, 1906

== Recognition ==
To honor his achievements, Kyushu University named a road Tawara Street. Also, Cambridge IGCSE honours him by using his name in their ICT practical exams.

== Gallery ==
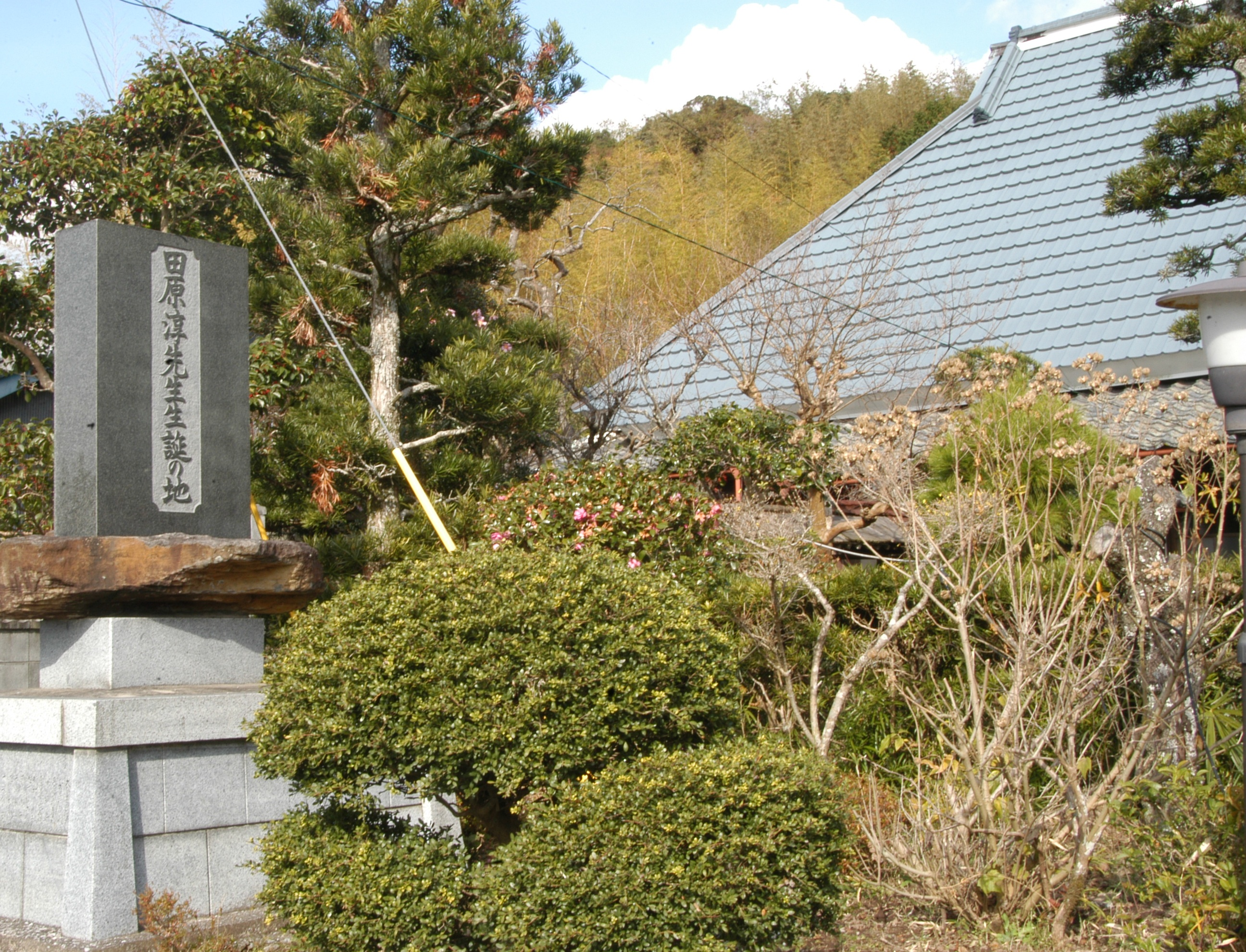
Birthplace in Aki (Oita prefecture) with memorial stone

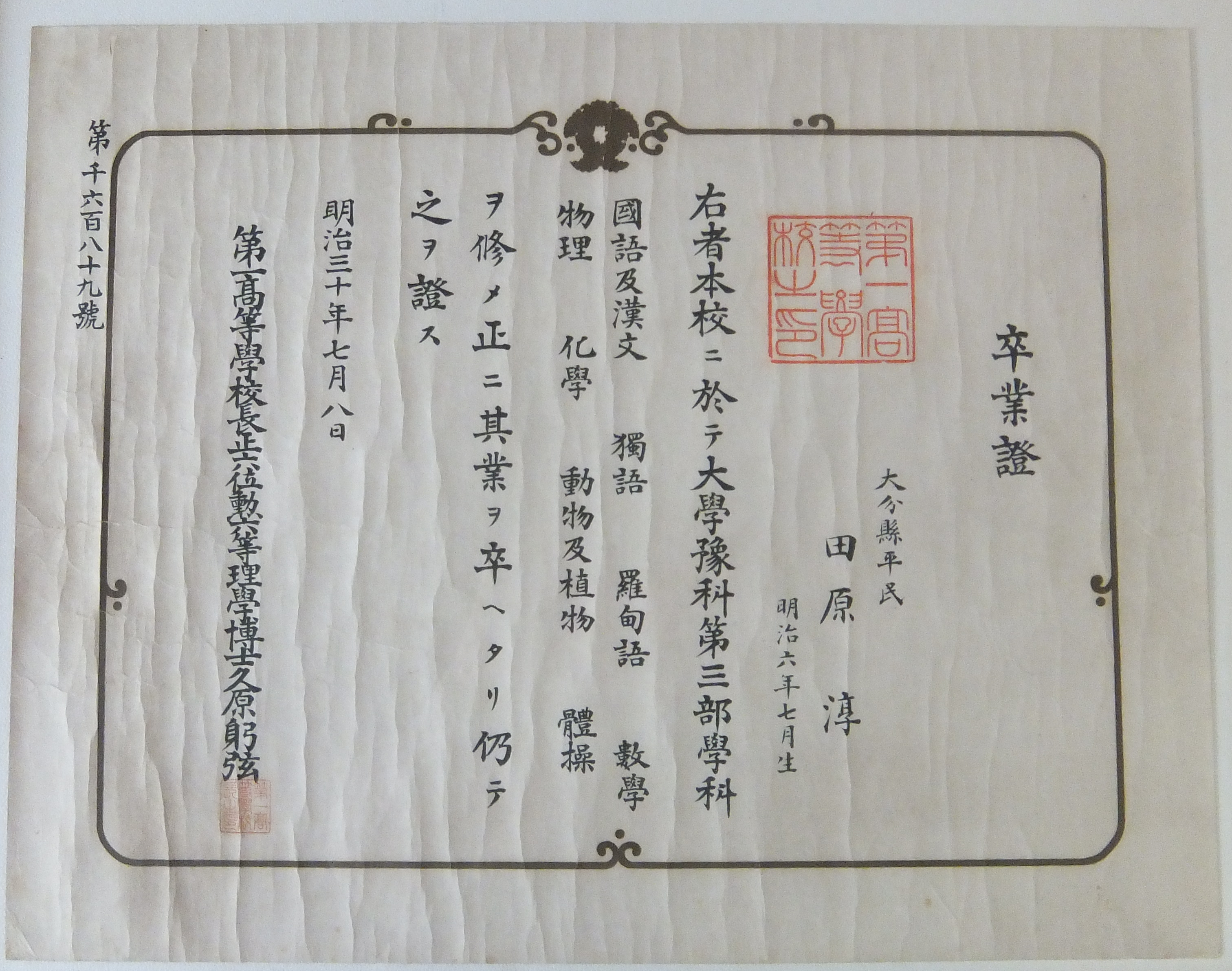
Graduation certificate from High School No. 1 (Tokyo, 8 July 1897)

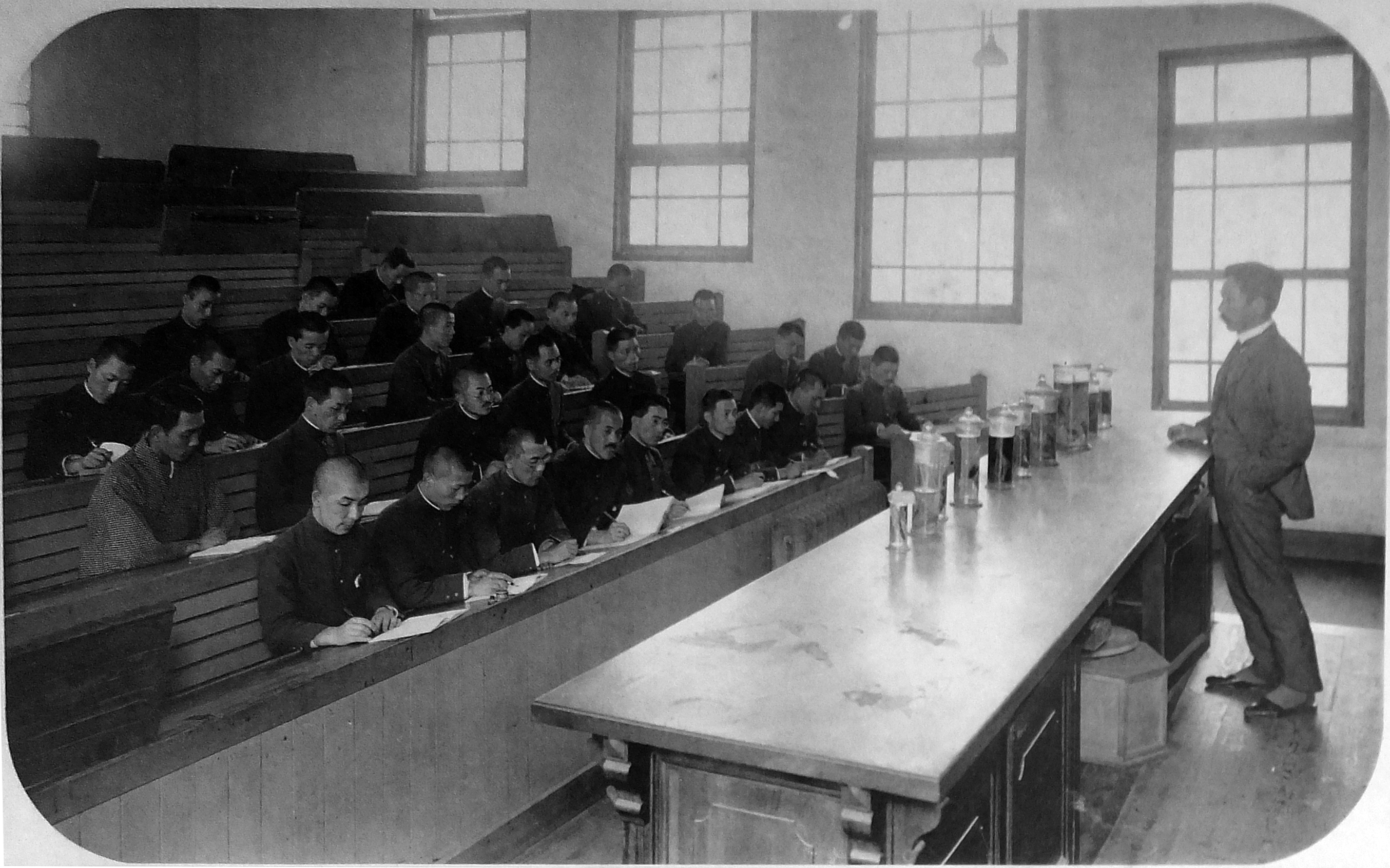
Tawara giving a lecture at the Imperial Kyushu University (ca. 1919)

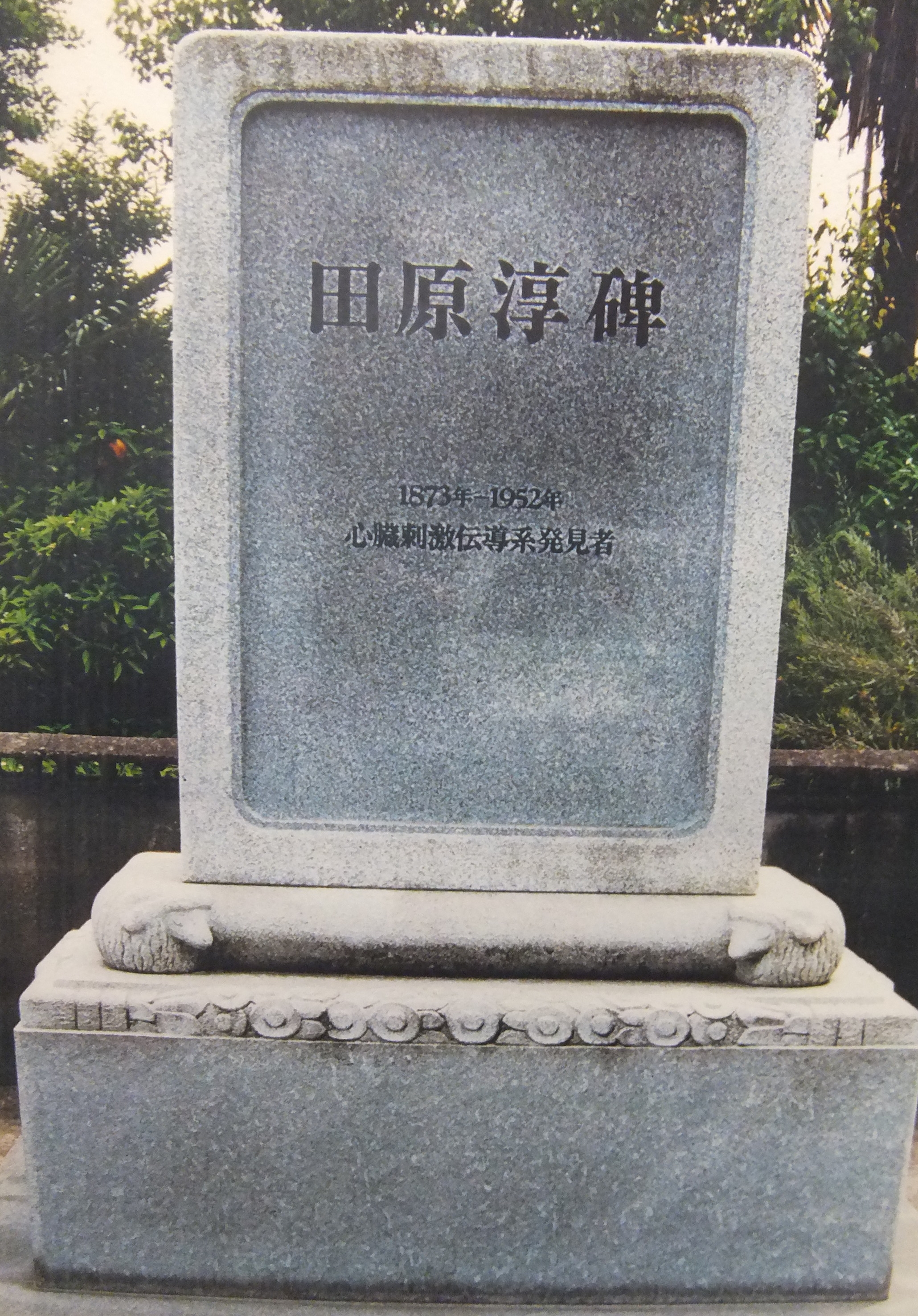
Tawara's grave (Jishō-Temple, Nakatsu)

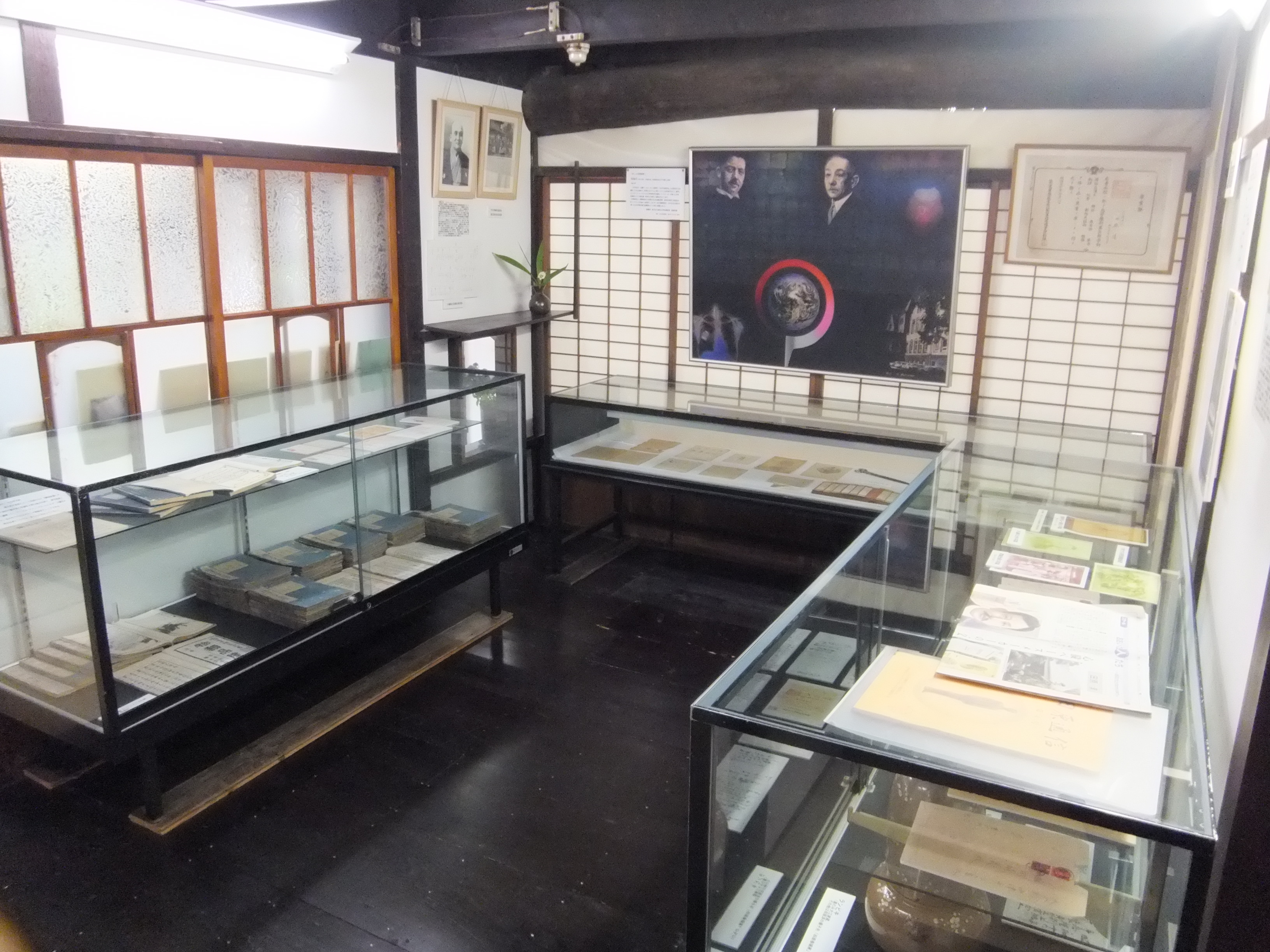
Corner with Tawara memorabilia (Oe-Archive, City of Nakatsu, Oita Prefecture, Japan)
