= Stannius ligature =

Experiment on conduction in frog hearts

The Stannius Ligature was an experimental procedure that robustly illustrated impulse conduction in the frog heart. This procedure decisively demonstrated that the Sinoatrial Node is the intrinsic origin pacemaker of the heart. A ligature placed either around the junction between the sinus venosus and atrium of the frog or turtle heart (first stannius ligature) or around the atrioventricular junction (second stannius ligature); demonstrates that the cardiac impulse is conducted from sinus venosus to atria to ventricle, but that successive chambers possess automaticity since each may continue to beat, but the atria now have a slower rate than the sinus venosus, and the ventricle either does not contract or beats at a slower rate than the atria.

== History ==
In 1852 H.F. Stannius experimented on the heart. By tying a ligature as a constriction between the sinus venosus and the atrium in the frog and also one around the atrioventricular groove, Stannius was able to demonstrate that the muscle tissues of the atria and ventricles have independent and spontaneous rhythms. His observations also indicated that the sinus is the pacemaker of the heartbeat. This remarkable observation has led to many innovations in cardiac surgery to avoid the major electrical bundles. Iatrogenic interventions in this region still face a hazard of a pacemaker afterwards.
