= Arthur Keith =

British anatomist and anthropologist (1866–1955)

Sir Arthur Keith FRS FRAI
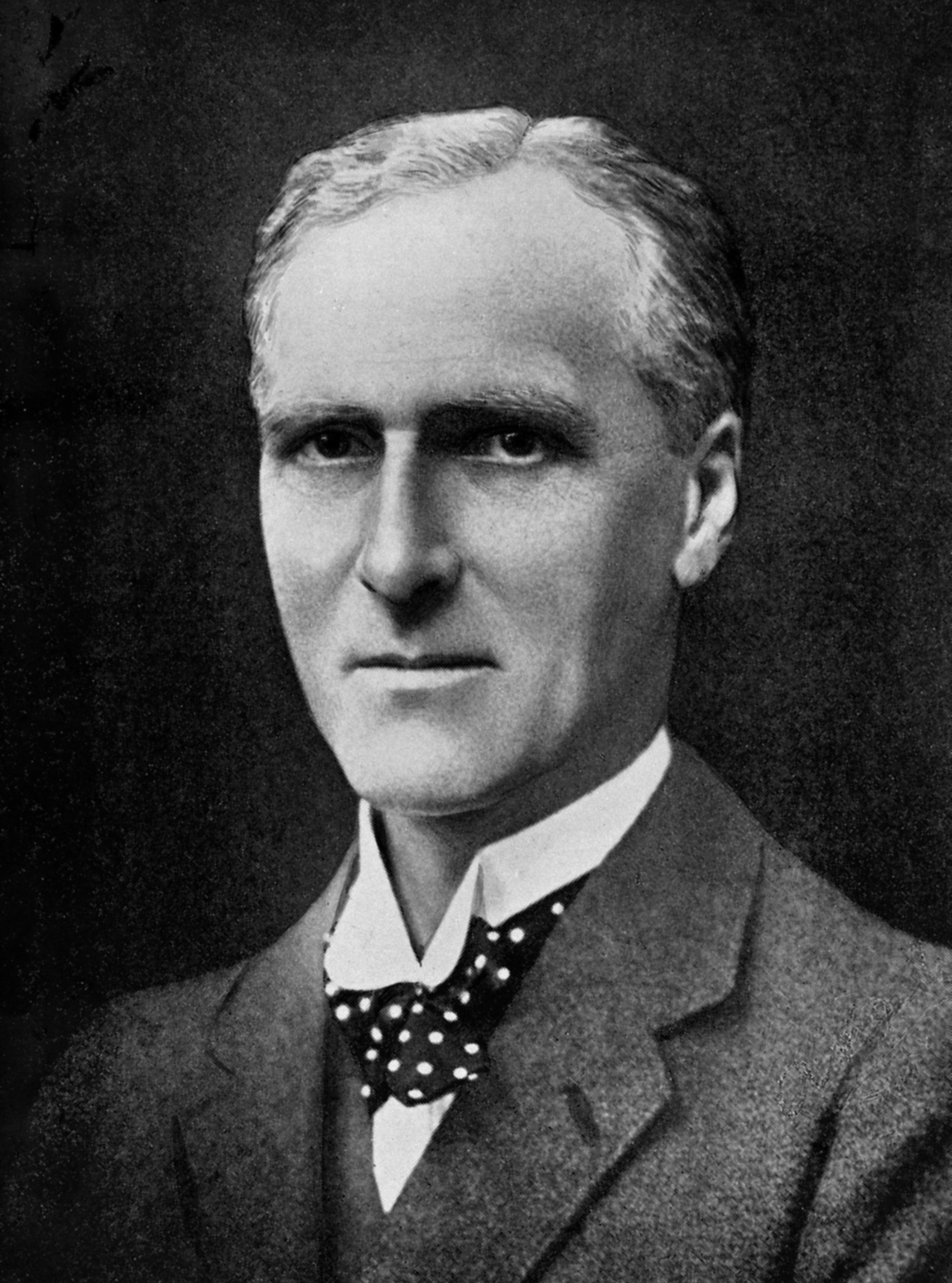
- Arthur Keith
- Born: 5 February 1866; Aberdeenshire
- Died: 7 January 1955 (aged 88); Downe, Kent
- Education: University of Aberdeen
- Known for: Group selection
- Awards: Fellow of the Royal Society
- Scientific career
- Fields: Anatomy; Anthropology

Signature
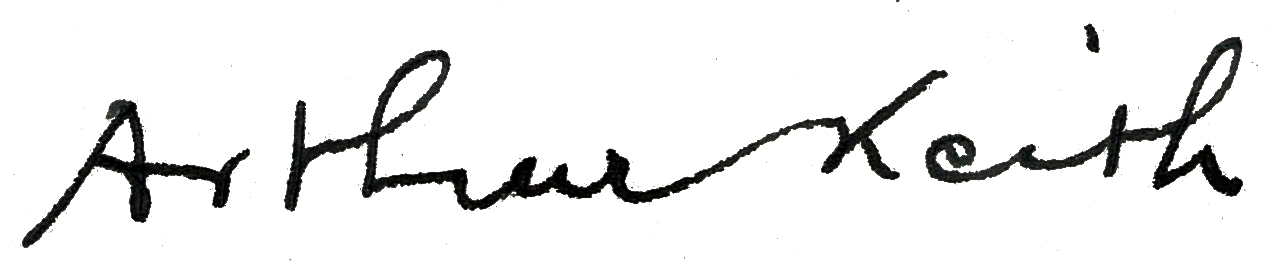

Sir Arthur Keith (5 February 1866 – 7 January 1955) was a British anatomist and anthropologist, and a proponent of scientific racism. He was a fellow and later the Hunterian Professor and conservator of the Hunterian Museum of the Royal College of Surgeons of England. He was a strong proponent of the Piltdown Man, but conceded it to be a forgery shortly before his death.

== Career ==
A leading figure in the study of human fossils, Keith became President of the Royal Anthropological Institute. The latter role stimulated his interest in the subject of human evolution, leading to the publication of his book A New Theory of Human Evolution, in which he supported the idea of group selection.

Where others had postulated that physical separation could provide a barrier to interbreeding, allowing groups to evolve along different lines, Keith introduced the idea of cultural differences as providing a mental barrier, emphasising territorial behaviour, and the concept of the "in-group" and "out-group." Keith claimed that humans had evolved through their tendency to live in small competing communities, which was at root determined by racial differences in their "genetic substrate." Writing just after World War II, he particularly emphasised the racial origins of anti-Semitism, and in A New Theory of Evolution he devoted a chapter to the topics of anti-Semitism and Zionism in which he argued that Jews had survived by developing a particularly strong sense of community between Jews worldwide based around cultural practices rather than homeland, while applying the "dual code" in such a way that perceived persecution strengthened their sense of superiority and cohesion.

He is also famous for discovering the sinoatrial node, the component of the heart which makes it beat, with his student Martin Flack in 1906.

== Life ==
He was born at Quarry Farm near Old Machar in Aberdeenshire, the son of John Keith, a farmer, and his wife, Jessie Macpherson. He was educated at Gordon's College in Aberdeen.

He obtained a Bachelor of Medicine at the University of Aberdeen in 1888. He travelled to Siam on a gold mining trip in 1889 where he gathered plants for Royal Botanic Gardens, Kew in London in his capacity as a plant collector assistant for the Botanical Survey of the Malay Peninsula.

On returning to Britain in 1892, Keith studied anatomy at University College London and at the University of Aberdeen. It was at Aberdeen where Keith won the first Struthers Prize in 1893 for his demonstration of ligaments in humans and other apes. In 1894, he was made a fellow of the Royal College of Surgeons of England. In 1908, as he says in A New Theory of Evolution, he was "put in charge of the vast treasury of things housed in the Museum of the Royal College of Surgeons," which brought about a shift in his interest from anatomy to the pursuit of "the machinery of human evolution."

He studied primate skulls, and in 1897 he published An Introduction to the Study of Anthropoid Apes. Other works include Human Embryology and Morphology (1902), Ancient Types of Man (1911), The Antiquity of Man (1915), Concerning Man's Origins (1927), and A New Theory of Human Evolution (1948).

Keith was editor of the Journal of Anatomy between 1915 and 1936 and elected president of the Anatomical Society of Great Britain and Ireland for 1918 to 1920. He gave the 1927 presidential address ("Darwin's Theory of Man's Descent As It Stands To-day") to the British Association meeting in Leeds. The same year the University of Leeds awarded him an honorary doctorate.

He was elected a Fellow of the Royal Society in 1913. He was knighted in 1921, and published New Discoveries in 1931. He was elected an International Member of the American Philosophical Society that same year. He was also an International Honorary Member of the American Academy of Arts and Sciences and an International Member of the United States National Academy of Sciences. In 1932, he helped found a research institute in Downe, Kent, where he worked until his death.

In 1899 he married Cecilia Caroline Gray (d.1934). They had no children.

He died at his home in Downe, Kent on 7 January 1955.

== European hypothesis ==
British anthropologists Keith and Grafton Elliot Smith were both fixed on European origin of humankind and were in opposition to models of Asian and African origin.

In 1925 Raymond Dart announced the discovery of Australopithecus africanus, which he claimed was evidence for an early human ancestor in Africa. The British anthropologists of the time, who firmly believed in the European hypothesis, did not accept finds outside of their own soil. Keith, for example, described "Darts child" as a juvenile ape and nothing to do with human ancestry.

== Racial views ==
In conjunction with his Eurocentric view on human evolution in Europe as being separate from Africa, Keith shared scientific racist views with a number of other intellectuals and writers during the 1920s, often based on Galtonism and the belief that opposition to cross-breeding in animals could be applied to miscegenation. In 1931, with John Walter Gregory, he delivered the annual Conway Hall lecture entitled "Race as a Political Factor". The lecture contained as its abstract: The three primary racial groups within the human species are the Caucasian, mongoloid and negroid. From analogy with cross-breeding in animals and plants, and from experience of human cross-breeding, it can be asserted that inter-marriage between members of the three groups produces inferior progeny. Hence racial segregation is to be recommended. However, the different races can still assist, and co-operate with, each other, in the interests of peace and harmony.

== Piltdown Man hoax ==
Keith was a strong proponent of the Piltdown Man. Piltdown: A Scientific Forgery, written by the anthropologist Frank Spencer after completing the research of Ian Langham (an Australian historian of science who suspected Keith, and died in 1984), explored the link between Keith and Charles Dawson and suggested it was Keith who prepared the fake specimens for Dawson to plant. Phillip Tobias details the history of the investigation of the hoax, dismissing other theories, and listing inconsistencies in Keith's statements and actions. While Martin Hinton was also suspected more recent evidence and scholarly consensus now point to Charles Dawson as having likely perpetrated the hoax on his own.

== Writings ==
=== A Manual of Practical Anatomy (1901) ===
with Alfred William Hughes

=== Concerning Man's Origins (1927) ===
Concerning Man's Origins, a book based on his Presidential Address at the British Association in 1927, contains a chapter entitled "Capital as a Factor in Evolution" in which he proposes an interesting explanation for Britain's leading role in the development of industrial society. Essentially he argues that the cold unwelcoming climate of Britain selected those who came here for a special ability to store food and supplies for the winter – those who didn't died out. This "capitalism" provided a secure way of life with time to think and experiment, for a population that had been selected for inventiveness and resourcefulness. Out of this special population sprang the Industrial Revolution, centred on the colder Northern counties of England like Lancashire and Yorkshire where the high-tech developments of the time took place in spinning and weaving. This is a rare book today, which does not appear to be available as a reprint.

=== The Place of Prejudice in Modern Civilisation (1931) ===
An address given to Students at Aberdeen University. Keith's concluding sentences in this book sums up his thesis: "Even in the modern world we must listen to the voice of Nature. Under the control of reason, prejudice has to be given a place in the regulation of human affairs." (p. 54) Keith remarks that the 18th century common sense realist philosopher Thomas Reid reached the same conclusion. Keith also cites Adam Smith, the theoretical father of capitalism, who in his The Theory of Moral Sentiments (1759) regarded prejudices as part of human nature, to both preserve human life and for the welfare of the common good. Keith concludes that the idea that prejudices "are not artificially acquired, but have been grafted deeply into our natures for particular purposes" is not merely a discovery of Darwinism. Indeed, from a Christian perspective, these arational feelings must serve some higher survival purpose and are so largely present in life, that they all can't be dismissed as "sin."

=== A New Theory of Human Evolution (1948) ===
In A New Theory of Human Evolution, Keith puts forward his ideas on the co-evolution of Human beings, Races, and Cultures, covering topics such as Patriotism, Resentment and Revenge, Morality, Leadership, Nationalism, and Race. His particular theory emphasises the ideas of "In-group versus Out-group," and the "Amity-enmity complex."

One chapter, entitled The Jews as a Nation and as a Race, tackles what is often referred to as 'the Jewish Question', postulating that the Jews are a special case of a race that has evolved to live as the "out-group" amongst other races, developing a special culture that enables it to survive by means of strong cultural traditions that bind the "in-group" with unusual loyalty and defensiveness. Such claims are very controversial today.

Physical copies of the book are difficult to obtain as it would seem that original copies exist only in small numbers, and that modern reprints do not exist. However, an online reprint of the book is available (see link below).

=== An Autobiography (1950) ===
Keith wrote his memoir when he was 84, because "a short time hence someone will have to write my obituary notice, so that what I set down now may then prove of service." He recounts how he came to pursue his scientific work, and reports on important people whom he met along the way—William Boyd Dawkins, Conan Doyle, Charles Sherrington and others. Nonetheless, the lengthy volume was deemed "completely unexciting. Events of sentimental interest and happenings of pure routine get almost equal emphasis."

=== Darwin Revalued (1955) ===
Keith went to live in a house very close to that which Darwin had occupied in Downe, Kent, in the latter years of his life, and took a great interest in trying to understand more about Charles Darwin. In this book, written just before he died, Keith gives a lot of detail about Darwin's family life, as well as his career.

== Prediction of the future ==
In September 1931, Keith and other prominent individuals of the time were invited by The New York Times to make a prediction concerning the world in eighty years time in the future, in 2011, to celebrate the paper's eightieth anniversary since its establishment in 1851. Keith's prediction warned against overspecialization:

Eighty years ago medicine was divided among three orders of specialists – physicians, surgeons, and midwives. Now there are more than fifty distinct special branches for the treatment of human ailments. It is this aspect of life – its ever growing specialization – which frightens me. Applying this law to The New York Times, I tremble when I think what its readers will find on their doorsteps every Sunday morning.

== Quotations ==
"Why is it that the feelings which accompany the practice of every kind of reprisal or of revenge are painful? Indeed, all the feelings which enter into the practice of the code of enmity are unpleasant and abiding. The explanation I offer is that resentment is unpleasant to make sure that it will be put into execution, so giving relief by gratification.

—Sir Arthur Keith, A New Theory of Human Evolution, (London: Watts & Co., 1948), 82.

"I have sought to prove ... that the code of enmity is a necessary part of the machinery of evolution. He who feels generous towards his enemy, and more especially if he feels forgiveness towards him, has in reality abandoned the code of enmity and so has given up his place in the turmoil of evolutionary competition. Hence the benign feeling of perfect peace that descends on him."
—Sir Arthur Keith, A New Theory of Human Evolution, (London: Watts & Co., 1948), 82.

"Another mark of race possessed by the Jews must be mentioned. Their conduct is regulated by a 'dual code'; their conduct towards their fellows is based on one code (amity), and that towards all who are outside their circle on another (enmity). The use of the dual code, as we have seen, is a mark of an evolving race. My deliberate opinion is that racial characters are more strongly developed in the Jews than in any other race."
—Sir Arthur Keith, A New Theory of Human Evolution, (London: Watts & Co., 1948), 390.

"The German Führer(Adolf Hitler), as I have consistently maintained, is an evolutionist; he has consciously sought to make the practice of Germany conform to the theory of evolution. He has failed, not because the theory of evolution is false, but because he has made three fatal blunders in its application. The first was in forcing the pace of evolution among his own people; he raised their warlike passions to such a heat that the only relief possible was that of aggressive war. His second mistake lay in his misconception of the evolutionary value of power. All that a sane evolutionist demands of power is that it should be sufficient to guarantee the security of a nation; more than that is an evolutionary abuse of power. When Hitler set out to conquer Europe, he had entered on that course which brought about the evolutionary destruction of Genghis Khan and his Mongol hordes (see Chapter 34). His third and greatest mistake was his failure to realize that such a monopoly of power meant insecurity for Britain, Russia, and America. His three great antagonists, although they do not preach the doctrine of evolution, are very consistent exponents of its tenets."

—Sir Arthur Keith, Essays on Human Evolution, (London: Watts & Co., 1946), 210 (cf. Evolution and Ethics, (New York: G. P. Putnam's Sons, 1947), 229.)

=== Spurious quotation ===
Evolution is unproved and unprovable. We believe it because the only alternative is special creation, and that is unthinkable.

This supposed quote is used by creationists in an attempt to demonstrate that Sir Arthur Keith simply dismisses evolutionist viewpoints outright due to a presumed anti-atheistic bias. However, in attempting to research this statement, one finds that it usually appears without primary source documentation. In those instances where seemingly original documentation is provided, it is stated to be a foreword for a centennial edition or "100th edition" of Origin of Species. However, several facts show that the attribution of these words to Arthur Keith is erroneous.

Keith died in 1955, some four years before the 100th anniversary of Darwin's work, so that he was clearly not available to write an introduction for the centennial edition (this was actually done by William Robin Thompson who did in fact hold anti-Darwinian views as can be seen from his foreword published the year after Keith died). Furthermore, while Keith did write an introduction to earlier printings of Origin of Species, in use from 1928 to 1958, the words given above do not appear in that introduction. Finally, the last "edition" of Origin of Species is the sixth edition published 1879. It is for this reason that all later publications of Origin of Species are actually reprints of this or earlier editions so that there is simply no "100th edition" of Darwin's work. The quote appears to stem from a 1947 article about—not by—Arthur Keith, in the magazine The Nineteenth Century, which was then misattributed.

== Literature ==
Redman, Samuel J. Bone Rooms: From Scientific Racism to Human Prehistory in Museums. (Cambridge: Harvard University Press) 2016.

Academic offices
Preceded by Charles Scott Sherrington	Fullerian Professor of Physiology; 1918–1924	Succeeded by Joseph Barcroft
Preceded by Earl of Birkenhead	Rector of the University of Aberdeen; 1930–1933	Succeeded by Walter Elliot
