= Martin Flack =

English doctor and physiologist

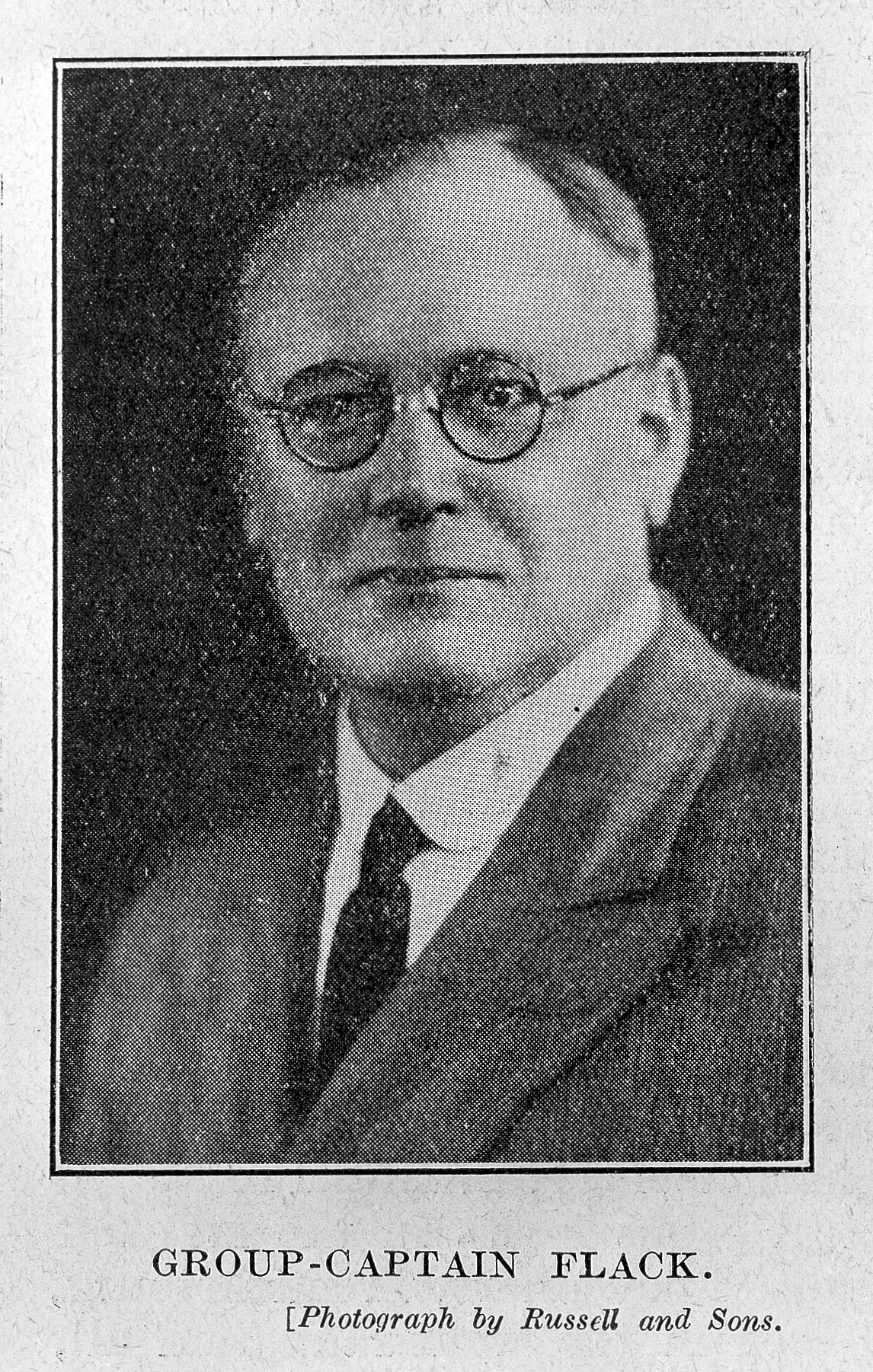

Martin William Flack CBE (20 March 1882 – 16 August 1931) was a British physiologist who co-discovered the sinoatrial node with Sir Arthur Keith in 1907.

Flack later became demonstrator of physiology at the London Hospital and later a lecturer. He served on the Medical Research Council and became the director of medical research for the Royal Air Force. He was appointed a Commander of the Order of the British Empire in the 1919 New Year Honours.

== Selected publications ==
- A Textbook of Physiology (1919)
