= Bundle of His =

Collection of heart muscle cells

- Isolated heart conduction system showing bundle of His

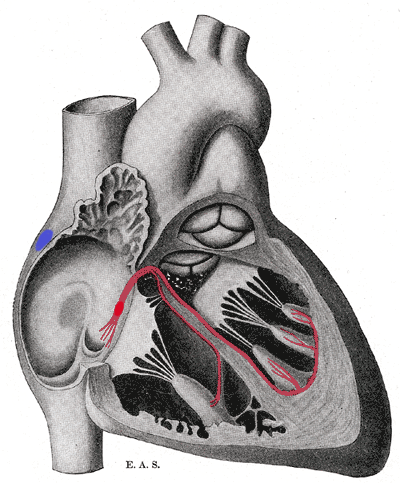
- Heart cut-away showing the bundle of His. Schematic representation of the atrioventricular bundle of His. The bundle, represented in red, originates near the orifice of the coronary sinus, undergoes slight enlargement to form the AV node. The AV node tapers down into the bundle of His, which passes into the ventricular septum and divides into two bundle branches, the left and right bundles. Sometimes the 'left and right bundles of His' are called Purkyně or Purkinje fibers. The ultimate distribution cannot be completely shown in this diagram.

Details

Identifiers
- Latin: fasciculus atrioventricularis
- MeSH: D002036
- TA98: A12.1.06.005
- TA2: 3955
- FMA: 9484

The bundle of His (BH) or His bundle (HB) (/hɪs/ "hiss") is a collection of heart muscle cells specialized for electrical conduction. As part of the electrical conduction system of the heart, it transmits the electrical impulses from the atrioventricular node (located between the atria and the ventricles) to the point of the apex of the fascicular branches via the bundle branches. The fascicular branches then lead to the Purkinje fibers, which provide electrical conduction to the ventricles, causing the cardiac muscle of the ventricles to contract at a paced interval.

== Function ==
The bundle of His is an important part of the electrical conduction system of the heart, as it transmits impulses from the atrioventricular node, located at the anterior-inferior end of the interatrial septum, to the ventricles of the heart. The bundle of His branches into the left and the right bundle branches, which run along the interventricular septum. The left bundle branch further divides into the left anterior fascicle and the left posterior fascicle. These bundles and fascicles give rise to thin filaments known as Purkinje fibers. These fibers distribute the impulse to the ventricular muscle. The ventricular conduction system comprises the bundle branches and the Purkinje networks. It takes about 0.03–0.04 seconds for the impulse to travel from the bundle of His to the ventricular muscle.

== Clinical significance ==
Disorders affecting the cardiomyocytes that make up the electrical conduction system of the heart are called heart blocks. Heart blocks are separated into different categories based on the location of the cellular damage. Damage to any of the conducting cells in or below the bundle of His is collectively referred to as "infra-Hisian blocks". To be specific, blocks that occur in the right or left bundle branches are called "bundle branch blocks", and those that occur in either the left anterior or the left posterior fascicles are called "fascicular blocks", or "hemiblocks". The conditions in which both the right bundle branch and either the left anterior fascicle or the left posterior fascicle are blocked are collectively referred to as bifascicular blocks, and the condition in which the right bundle branch, the left anterior fascicle, and the left posterior fascicle are blocked is called trifascicular block. Infra-hisian blocks limit the heart's ability to coordinate the activities of the atria and ventricles, which usually results in a decrease in its efficiency in pumping blood.

=== Pacing ===
A 2000 study found that direct His bundle pacing is more effective in producing synchronized ventricular contraction—and therefore in improving cardiac function—than apical pacing.

== Etymology ==
These specialized muscle fibers in the heart were named after the Swiss cardiologist Wilhelm His Jr., who discovered them in 1893.

== See also ==
- Atrioventricular node
- Bachmann's bundle
- Bundle branches
- Bundle of Kent
- Purkinje Fibers
- Sinoatrial node
