= Purkinje fibers =

Fibers in the wall of the heart

- Isolated heart conduction system showing Purkinje fibers

- The QRS complex is the large peak.

Details

Identifiers
- Latin: rami subendocardiales
- MeSH: D011690
- TA98: A12.1.06.008
- TA2: 3961
- FMA: 9492

The Purkinje fibers (English: /pɜːr.ˈkɪn.dʒi/ pur-KIN-jee; Czech: [ˈpurkɪɲɛ]), also known as Purkinje tissue or subendocardial branches, are located in the inner ventricular walls of the heart, just beneath the endocardium in a space called the subendocardium. The Purkinje fibers are specialized conducting fibers composed of electrically excitable muscle cells.

They are larger than cardiomyocytes, with fewer myofibrils and many mitochondria. Purkinje fibers conduct cardiac action potentials more quickly and efficiently than any of the other cells in the heart's electrical conduction system.

Purkinje fibers allow the heart's conduction system to create synchronized contractions of its ventricles; they are essential for maintaining healthy and consistent heart rhythm.

Purkinje fibers are named after the Czech scientist Jan Evangelista Purkyně, who discovered them in 1839.

== Histology ==
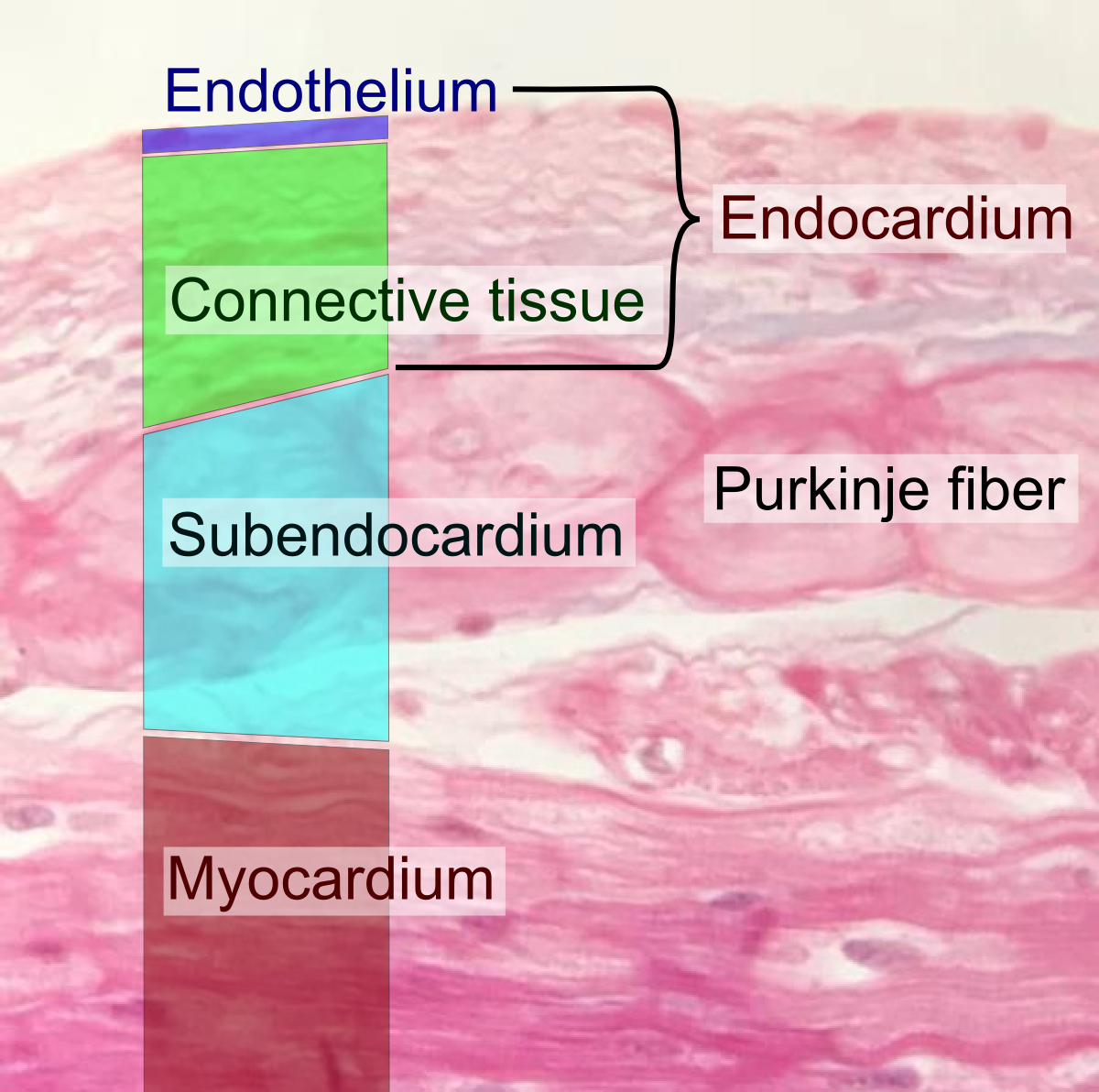
Purkinje fiber just beneath the endocardium

Purkinje fibers are a unique cardiac end-organ. Further histologic examination reveals that these fibers are split in ventricles' walls. The electrical origin of atrial Purkinje fibers arrives from the sinoatrial node.

Given no aberrant channels, the Purkinje fibers are distinctly shielded from each other by collagen or the cardiac skeleton.

The Purkinje fibers are further specialized to rapidly conduct impulses (having numerous fast voltage-gated sodium channels and mitochondria, and fewer myofibrils, than the surrounding muscle tissue). Purkinje fibers take up stain differently from the surrounding muscle cells because of having relatively fewer myofibrils than other cardiac cells. The presence of glycogen around the nucleus causes Purkinje fibers to appear, on a microscope slide, lighter and larger than their neighbors, being arranged along the longitudinal direction (parallel to the cardiac vector). They are often binucleated cells.

== Function ==
Heart rate is governed by many influences from the autonomic nervous system. The Purkinje fibers do not have any known role in setting heart rate unless the sinoatrial node (SA node) is compromised, in which case they can act as pacemaker cells. Purkinje fibers are influenced by electrical discharge from the sinoatrial node.

=== Impulse carrying ===
During the ventricular contraction portion of the cardiac cycle, the Purkinje fibers carry the contraction impulse from both the left and right bundle branches to the myocardium of the respective ventricles. This causes the muscle tissue of the ventricles to contract. This generates force to eject blood out of the heart, either to the pulmonary circulation from the right ventricle, or to the systemic circulation from the left ventricle.

=== Replacement pacemaker ===
Purkinje fibers also have the ability of firing at a rate of 20–40 beats per minute if upstream conduction or pacemaking ability is compromised. In contrast, the sinoatrial node in normal state can fire at 60-100 beats per minute. In short, they generate action potentials, but at a slower rate than the SA (sinoatrial) node. This capability is normally suppressed. Thus, they serve as the last resort when other pacemakers fail. When a Purkinje fiber does fire, it is called a premature ventricular contraction (commonly referred to as a PVC); in other situations, it can be considered a ventricular escape beat. The premature ventricular contraction (PVC) is occurs early in the heart beat; the ventricular escape occurs late.

== See also ==
- List of distinct cell types in the adult human body
