= Heart rate =

Speed of the heartbeat, measured in beats per minute

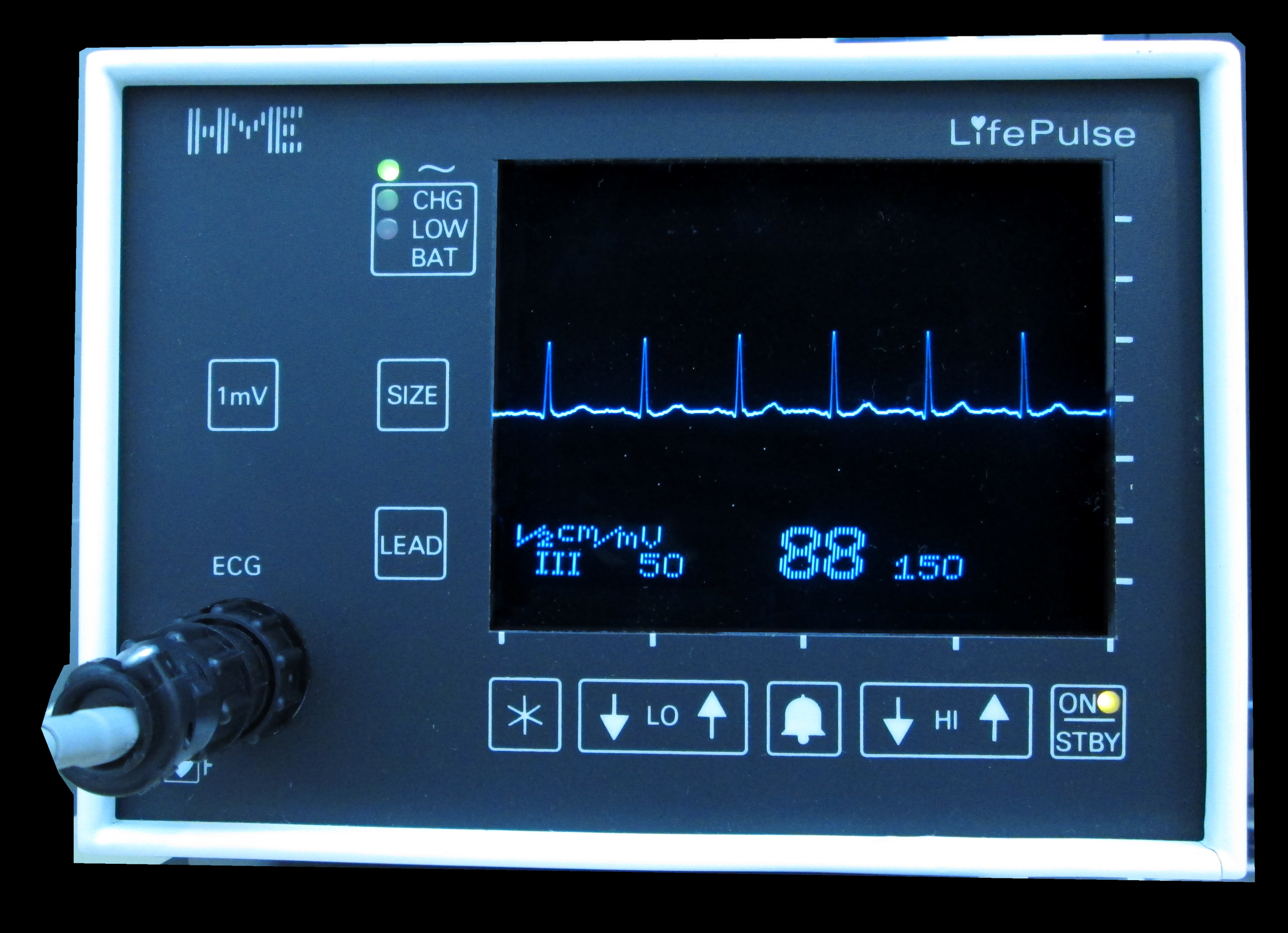
A medical monitoring device displaying a normal human heart rate

Heart rate is the frequency of the heartbeat measured by the number of contractions of the heart per minute (beats per minute or bpm). The heart rate varies according to the body's physical needs, including the need to absorb oxygen and excrete carbon dioxide. It is also modulated by numerous factors, including genetics, physical fitness, stress or psychological status, diet, drugs, hormonal status, environment, and disease/illness, as well as the interaction between these factors. It is usually equal or close to the pulse rate measured at any peripheral point.

The American Heart Association states the normal resting adult human heart rate is 60–100 bpm. An ultra-trained athlete may have a resting heart rate of 37–38 bpm.

Tachycardia is a high heart rate, defined as above 100 bpm at rest.

Bradycardia is a low heart rate, defined as below 60 bpm at rest. When a human sleeps, a heartbeat with rates around 40–50 bpm is common and considered normal. When the heart is not beating in a regular pattern, this is referred to as a arrhythmia. Abnormalities of heart rate sometimes indicate heart disease.

== Physiology ==
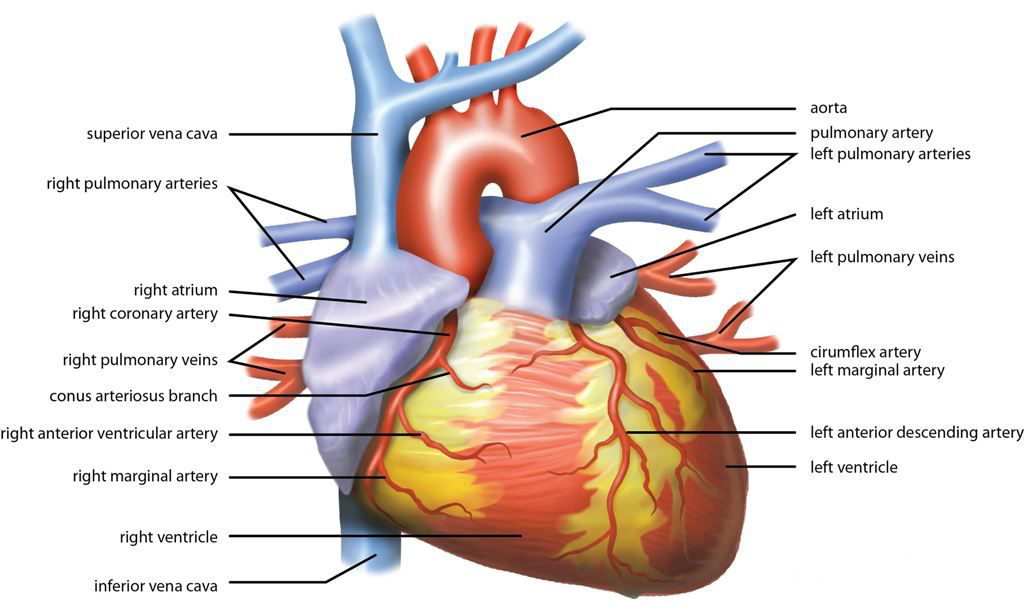
The human heart

Normal heart sounds
Normal heart sounds as heard with a stethoscope

Emily's racing heartbeat
Heart sounds of a 16 year old girl immediately after running, with a heart rate of 186 BPM. The S1 heart sound is intensified due to the increased cardiac output.

While heart rhythm is regulated entirely by the sinoatrial node under normal conditions, heart rate is regulated by sympathetic and parasympathetic input to the sinoatrial node. The accelerans nerve provides sympathetic input to the heart by releasing norepinephrine onto the cells of the sinoatrial node (SA node), and the vagus nerve provides parasympathetic input to the heart by releasing acetylcholine onto sinoatrial node cells. Therefore, stimulation of the accelerans nerve increases heart rate, while stimulation of the vagus nerve decreases it.

- Central nervous system stimulants such as substituted amphetamines increase heart rate.
- Central nervous system depressants or sedatives decrease the heart rate (apart from some particularly strange ones with equally strange effects, such as ketamine which can cause – amongst many other things – stimulant-like effects such as tachycardia).

There are many ways in which the heart rate speeds up or slows down. Most involve stimulant-like endorphins and hormones being released in the brain, some of which are those that are 'forced'/'enticed' out by the ingestion and processing of drugs such as cocaine or atropine.

This section discusses target heart rates for healthy persons, which would be inappropriately high for most persons with coronary artery disease.

=== Influences from the central nervous system ===
==== Cardiovascular centres ====
The heart rate is rhythmically generated by the sinoatrial node. It is also influenced by central factors through sympathetic and parasympathetic nerves. Nervous influence over the heart rate is centralized within the two paired cardiovascular centres of the medulla oblongata. The cardioaccelerator regions stimulate activity via sympathetic stimulation of the cardioaccelerator nerves, and the cardioinhibitory centers decrease heart activity via parasympathetic stimulation as one component of the vagus nerve. During rest, both centers provide slight stimulation to the heart, contributing to autonomic tone. This is a similar concept to tone in skeletal muscles. Normally, vagal stimulation predominates as, left unregulated, the SA node would initiate a sinus rhythm of approximately 100 bpm.

Both sympathetic and parasympathetic stimuli flow through the paired cardiac plexus near the base of the heart. The cardioaccelerator center also sends additional fibers, forming the cardiac nerves via sympathetic ganglia (the cervical ganglia plus superior thoracic ganglia T1–T4) to both the SA and AV nodes, plus additional fibers to the atria and ventricles. The ventricles are more richly innervated by sympathetic fibers than parasympathetic fibers. Sympathetic stimulation causes the release of the neurotransmitter norepinephrine (also known as noradrenaline) at the neuromuscular junction of the cardiac nerves. This shortens the repolarization period, thus speeding the rate of depolarization and contraction, which results in an increased heartrate. It opens chemical or ligand-gated sodium and calcium ion channels, allowing an influx of positively charged ions.

Norepinephrine binds to the beta–1 receptor. High blood pressure medications are used to block these receptors and so reduce the heart rate.

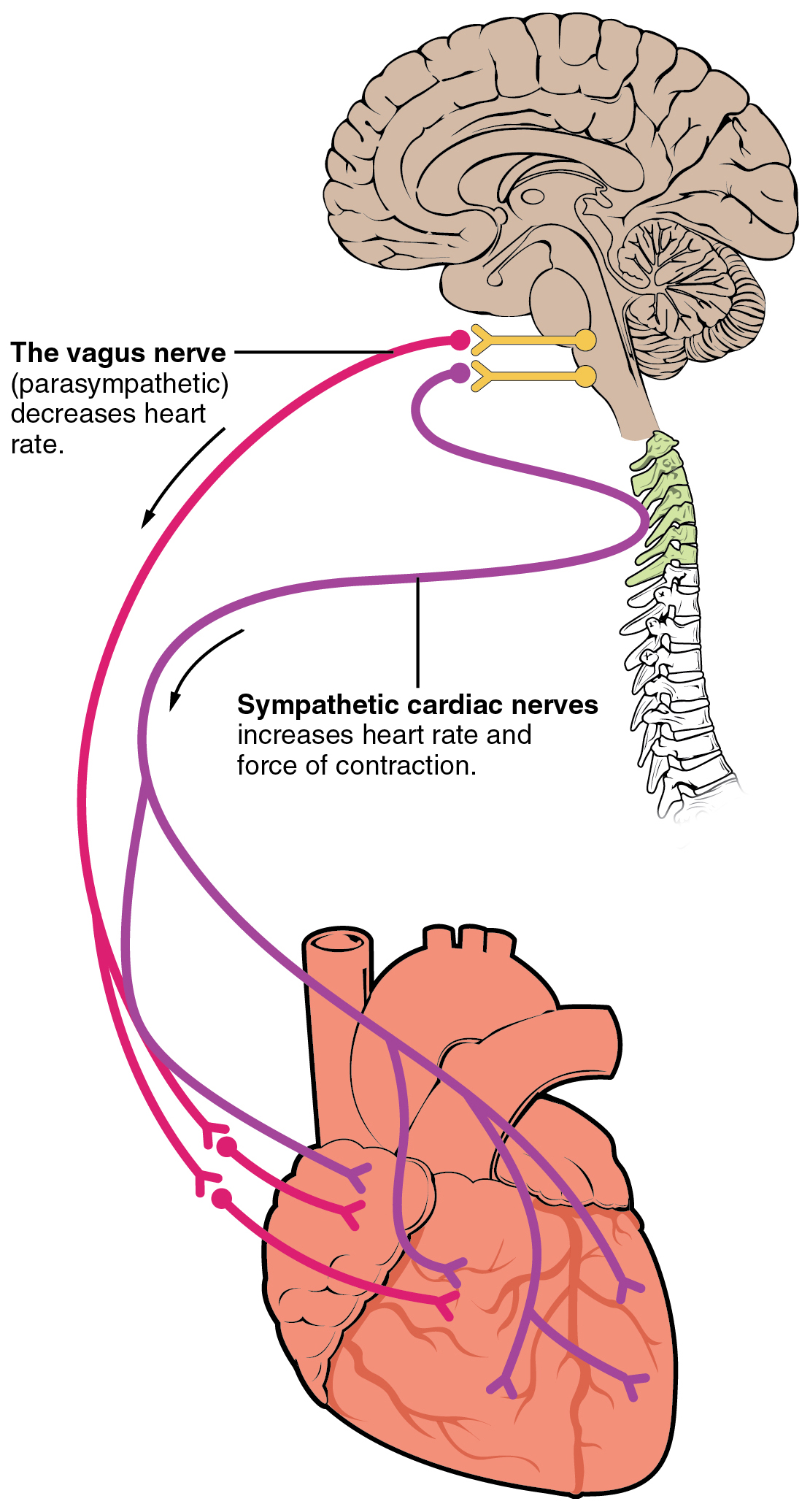
Autonomic innervation of the heart: Cardioaccelerator and cardioinhibitory areas are components of the paired cardiac centers located in the medulla oblongata of the brain. They innervate the heart via sympathetic cardiac nerves that increase cardiac activity and vagus (parasympathetic) nerves that slow cardiac activity.

Parasympathetic stimulation originates from the cardioinhibitory region of the brain with impulses traveling via the vagus nerve (cranial nerve X). The vagus nerve sends branches to both the SA and AV nodes, and to portions of both the atria and ventricles. Parasympathetic stimulation releases the neurotransmitter acetylcholine (ACh) at the neuromuscular junction. ACh slows HR by opening chemical- or ligand-gated potassium ion channels to slow the rate of spontaneous depolarization, which extends repolarization and increases the time before the next spontaneous depolarization occurs. Without any nervous stimulation, the SA node would establish a sinus rhythm of approximately 100 bpm. Since resting rates are considerably less than this, it becomes evident that parasympathetic stimulation normally slows HR. This is similar to an individual driving a car with one foot on the brake pedal. To speed up, one need merely remove one's foot from the brake and let the engine increase speed. In the case of the heart, decreasing parasympathetic stimulation decreases the release of ACh, which allows HR to increase up to approximately 100 bpm. Any increases beyond this rate would require sympathetic stimulation.

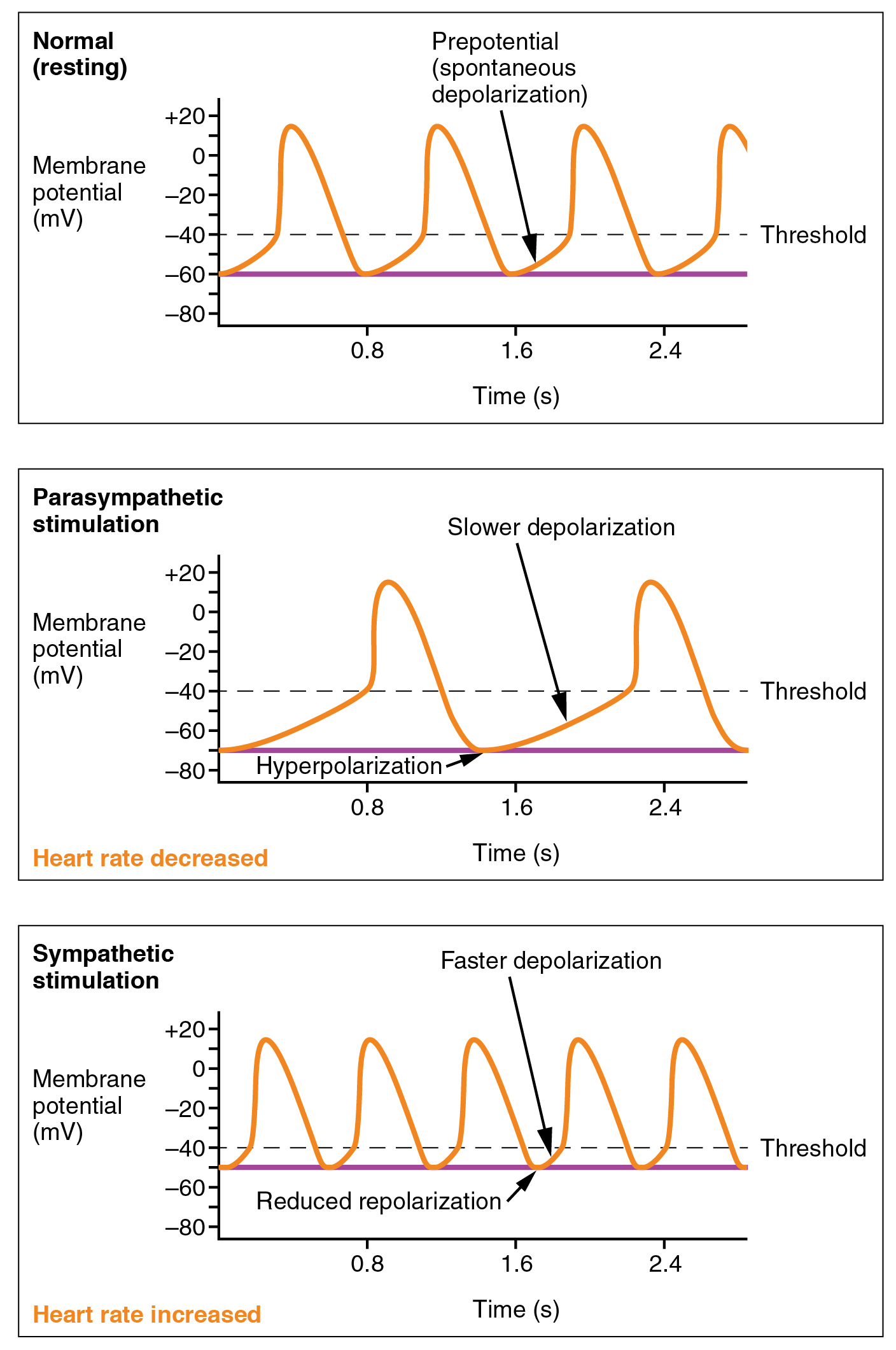
Effects of parasympathetic and sympathetic stimulation on normal sinus rhythm: The wave of depolarization in a normal sinus rhythm shows a stable resting HR. Following parasympathetic stimulation, HR slows. Following sympathetic stimulation, HR increases.

==== Input to the cardiovascular centres ====
The cardiovascular centre receives input from a series of visceral receptors with impulses traveling through visceral sensory fibers within the vagus and sympathetic nerves via the cardiac plexus. Among these receptors are various proprioreceptors, baroreceptors, and chemoreceptors, plus stimuli from the limbic system which normally enable the precise regulation of heart function, via cardiac reflexes. Increased physical activity results in increased rates of firing by various proprioreceptors located in muscles, joint capsules, and tendons. The cardiovascular centres monitor these increased rates of firing, suppressing parasympathetic stimulation or increasing sympathetic stimulation as needed in order to increase blood flow.

Similarly, baroreceptors are stretch receptors located in the aortic sinus, carotid bodies, the venae cavae, and other locations, including pulmonary vessels and the right side of the heart itself. Rates of firing from the baroreceptors represent blood pressure, level of physical activity, and the relative distribution of blood. The cardiac centers monitor baroreceptor firing to maintain cardiac homeostasis, a mechanism called the baroreceptor reflex. With increased pressure and stretch, the rate of baroreceptor firing increases, and the cardiac centers decrease sympathetic stimulation and increase parasympathetic stimulation. As pressure and stretch decrease, the rate of baroreceptor firing decreases, and the cardiac centers increase sympathetic stimulation and decrease parasympathetic stimulation.

There is a similar reflex, called the atrial reflex or Bainbridge reflex, associated with varying rates of blood flow to the atria. Increased venous return stretches the walls of the atria where specialized baroreceptors are located. However, as the atrial baroreceptors increase their rate of firing and as they stretch due to the increased blood pressure, the cardiac center responds by increasing sympathetic stimulation and inhibiting parasympathetic stimulation to increase HR. The opposite is also true.

Increased metabolic byproducts associated with increased activity, such as carbon dioxide, hydrogen ions, and lactic acid, plus falling oxygen levels, are detected by a suite of chemoreceptors innervated by the glossopharyngeal and vagus nerves. These chemoreceptors provide feedback to the cardiovascular centers about the need for increased or decreased blood flow, based on the relative levels of these substances.

The limbic system can also significantly impact HR related to emotional state. During periods of stress, it is not unusual to identify higher than normal HRs, often accompanied by a surge in the stress hormone cortisol. Individuals experiencing extreme anxiety may manifest panic attacks with symptoms that resemble those of heart attacks. These events are typically transient and treatable. Meditation techniques have been developed to ease anxiety and have been shown to lower HR effectively. Doing simple deep and slow breathing exercises with one's eyes closed can also significantly reduce this anxiety and HR.

=== Factors influencing heart rate ===
Table 1: Major factors increasing heart rate and force of contraction
Factor	Effect
Cardioaccelerator nerves	Release of norepinephrine
Proprioreceptors	Increased rates of firing during exercise
Chemoreceptors	Decreased levels of O_{2}; increased levels of H^{+}, CO_{2}, and lactic acid
Baroreceptors	Decreased rates of firing, indicating falling blood volume/pressure
Limbic system	Anticipation of physical exercise or strong emotions
Catecholamines	Increased epinephrine and norepinephrine
Thyroid hormones	Increased T3 and T4
Calcium	Increased Ca^{2+}
Potassium	Decreased K^{+}
Sodium	Decreased Na^{+}
Body temperature	Increased body temperature
Nicotine and caffeine	Stimulants, increasing heart rate

Table 2: Factors decreasing heart rate and force of contraction
Factor	Effect
Cardioinhibitor nerves (vagus)	Release of acetylcholine
Proprioreceptors	Decreased rates of firing following exercise
Chemoreceptors	Increased levels of O_{2}; decreased levels of H^{+} and CO_{2}
Baroreceptors	Increased rates of firing, indicating higher blood volume/pressure
Limbic system	Anticipation of relaxation
Catecholamines	Decreased epinephrine and norepinephrine
Thyroid hormones	Decreased T3 and T4
Calcium	Decreased Ca^{2+}
Potassium	Increased K^{+}
Sodium	Increased Na^{+}
Body temperature	Decrease in body temperature

Using a combination of autorhythmicity and innervation, the cardiovascular center is able to provide relatively precise control over the heart rate, but other factors can impact on this. These include hormones, notably epinephrine, norepinephrine, and thyroid hormones; levels of various ions including calcium, potassium, and sodium; body temperature; hypoxia; and pH balance.

==== Epinephrine and norepinephrine ====
The catecholamines, epinephrine and norepinephrine, secreted by the adrenal medulla form one component of the extended fight-or-flight mechanism. The other component is sympathetic stimulation. Epinephrine and norepinephrine have similar effects: binding to the beta-1 adrenergic receptors, and opening sodium and calcium ion chemical- or ligand-gated channels. The rate of depolarization is increased by this additional influx of positively charged ions, so the threshold is reached more quickly and the period of repolarization is shortened. However, massive releases of these hormones coupled with sympathetic stimulation may actually lead to arrhythmias. There is no parasympathetic stimulation to the adrenal medulla.

==== Thyroid hormones ====
In general, increased levels of the thyroid hormones (thyroxine(T4) and triiodothyronine (T3)), increase the heart rate; excessive levels can trigger tachycardia. The impact of thyroid hormones is typically of a much longer duration than that of the catecholamines. The physiologically active form of triiodothyronine, has been shown to directly enter cardiomyocytes and alter activity at the level of the genome. It also impacts the beta-adrenergic response similar to epinephrine and norepinephrine.

==== Calcium ====
Calcium ion levels have a great impact on heart rate and myocardial contractility: increased calcium levels cause an increase in both. High levels of calcium ions result in hypercalcemia and excessive levels can induce cardiac arrest. Drugs known as calcium channel blockers slow HR by binding to these channels and blocking or slowing the inward movement of calcium ions.

==== Caffeine and nicotine ====
Caffeine and nicotine are both stimulants of the nervous system and of the cardiac centres causing an increased heart rate. Caffeine works by increasing the rates of depolarization at the SA node, whereas nicotine stimulates the activity of the sympathetic neurons that deliver impulses to the heart.

==== Effects of stress ====
Both surprise and stress induce physiological response: elevate heart rate substantially. In a study conducted on 8 female and male student actors ages 18 to 25, their reaction to an unforeseen occurrence (the cause of stress) during a performance was observed in terms of heart rate. In the data collected, there was a noticeable trend between the location of actors (onstage and offstage) and their elevation in heart rate in response to stress; the actors present offstage reacted to the stressor immediately, demonstrated by their immediate elevation in heart rate the minute the unexpected event occurred, but the actors present onstage at the time of the stressor reacted in the following 5 minute period (demonstrated by their increasingly elevated heart rate). This trend regarding stress and heart rate is supported by previous studies; negative emotion/stimulus has a prolonged effect on heart rate in individuals who are directly impacted. In regard to the characters present onstage, a reduced startle response has been associated with a passive defense, and the diminished initial heart rate response has been predicted to have a greater tendency to dissociation. Current evidence suggests that heart rate variability can be used as an accurate measure of psychological stress and may be used for an objective measurement of psychological stress.

==== Factors decreasing heart rate ====
The heart rate can be slowed by altered sodium and potassium levels, hypoxia, acidosis, alkalosis, and hypothermia. The relationship between electrolytes and HR is complex, but maintaining electrolyte balance is critical to the normal wave of depolarization. Of the two ions, potassium has the greater clinical significance. Initially, both hyponatremia (low sodium levels) and hypernatremia (high sodium levels) may lead to tachycardia. Severely high hypernatremia may lead to fibrillation, which may cause cardiac output to cease. Severe hyponatremia leads to both bradycardia and other arrhythmias. Hypokalemia (low potassium levels) also leads to arrhythmias, whereas hyperkalemia (high potassium levels) causes the heart to become weak and flaccid, and ultimately to fail.

Heart muscle relies exclusively on aerobic metabolism for energy. Severe myocardial infarction (commonly called a heart attack) can lead to a decreasing heart rate, since metabolic reactions fueling heart contraction are restricted.

Acidosis is a condition in which excess hydrogen ions are present, and the patient's blood expresses a low pH value. Alkalosis is a condition in which there are too few hydrogen ions, and the patient's blood has an elevated pH. Normal blood pH falls in the range of 7.35–7.45, so a number lower than this range represents acidosis and a higher number represents alkalosis. Enzymes, being the regulators or catalysts of virtually all biochemical reactions – are sensitive to pH and will change shape slightly with values outside their normal range. These variations in pH and accompanying slight physical changes to the active site on the enzyme decrease the rate of formation of the enzyme-substrate complex, subsequently decreasing the rate of many enzymatic reactions, which can have complex effects on HR. Severe changes in pH will lead to denaturation of the enzyme.

The last variable is body temperature. Elevated body temperature is called hyperthermia, and suppressed body temperature is called hypothermia. Slight hyperthermia results in increasing HR and strength of contraction. Hypothermia slows the rate and strength of heart contractions. This distinct slowing of the heart is one component of the larger diving reflex that diverts blood to essential organs while submerged. If sufficiently chilled, the heart will stop beating, a technique that may be employed during open heart surgery. In this case, the patient's blood is normally diverted to an artificial heart-lung machine to maintain the body's blood supply and gas exchange until the surgery is complete, and sinus rhythm can be restored. Excessive hyperthermia and hypothermia will both result in death, as enzymes drive the body systems to cease normal function, beginning with the central nervous system.

==== Physiological control over heart rate ====
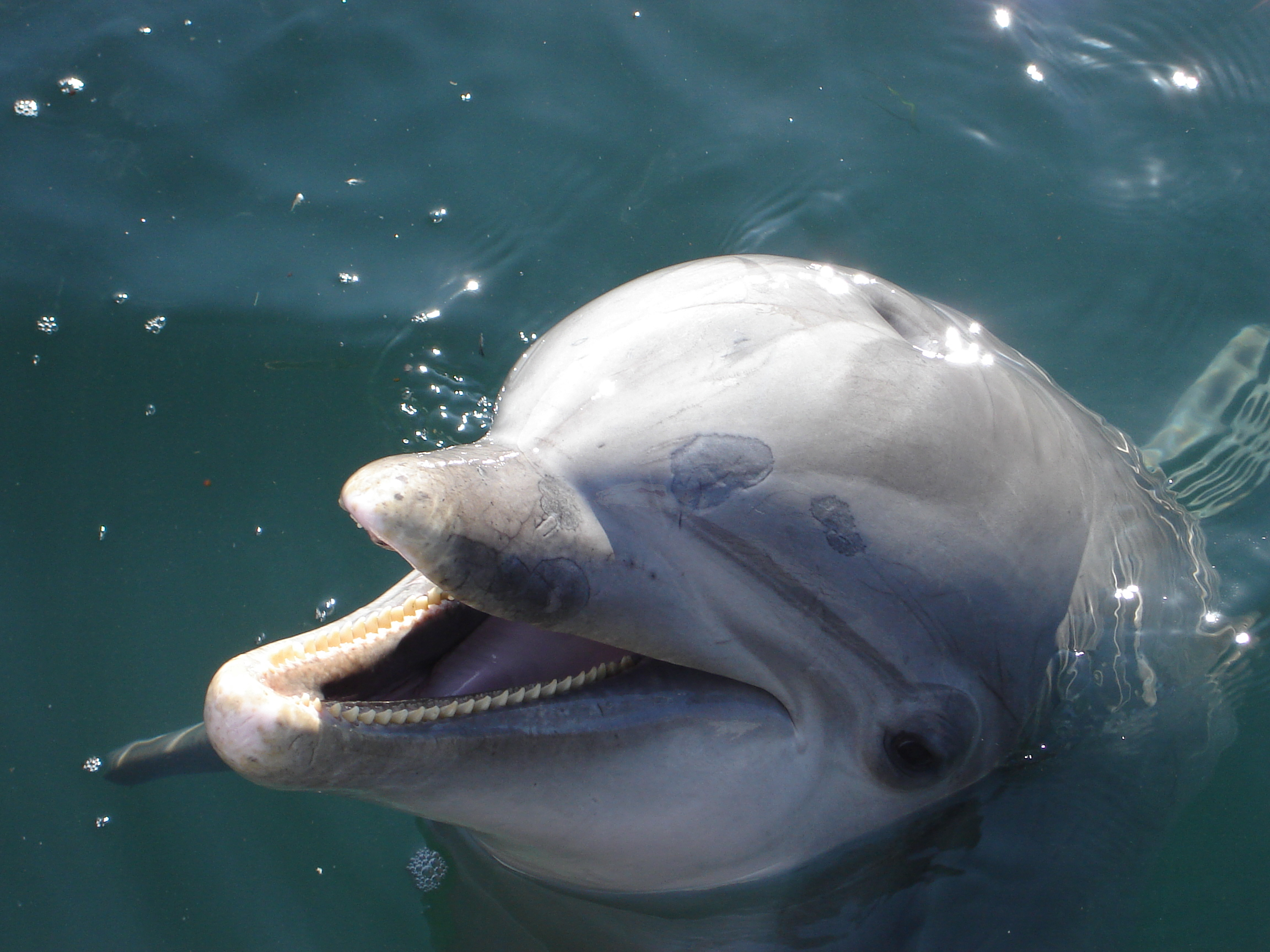
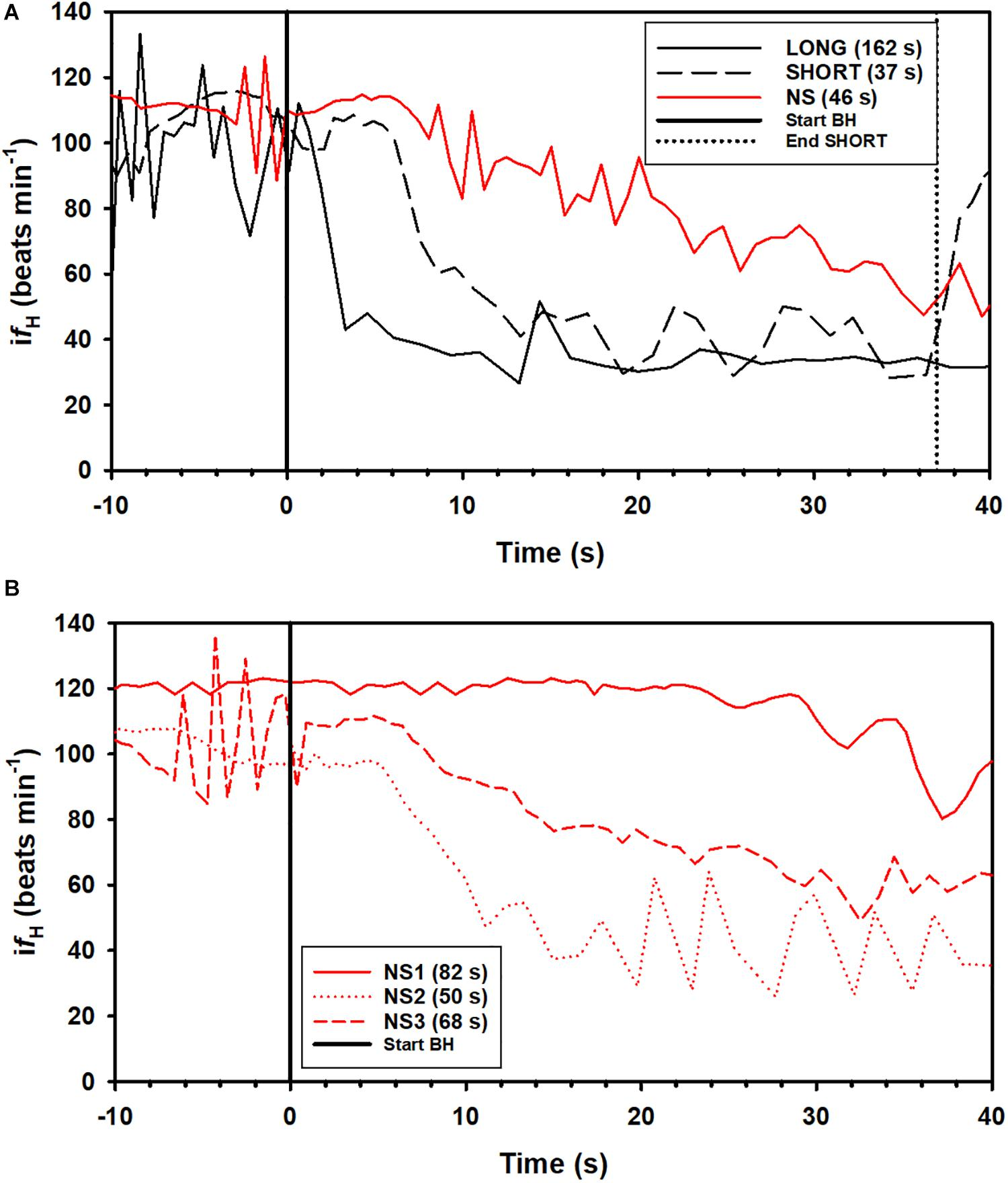
Dolphin heart rate graph

A study shows that bottlenose dolphins can learn – apparently via instrumental conditioning – to rapidly and selectively slow down their heart rate during diving for conserving oxygen depending on external signals. In humans regulating heart rate by methods such as listening to music, meditation or a vagal maneuver takes longer and lowers the rate to a much lesser extent.

== In different circumstances ==
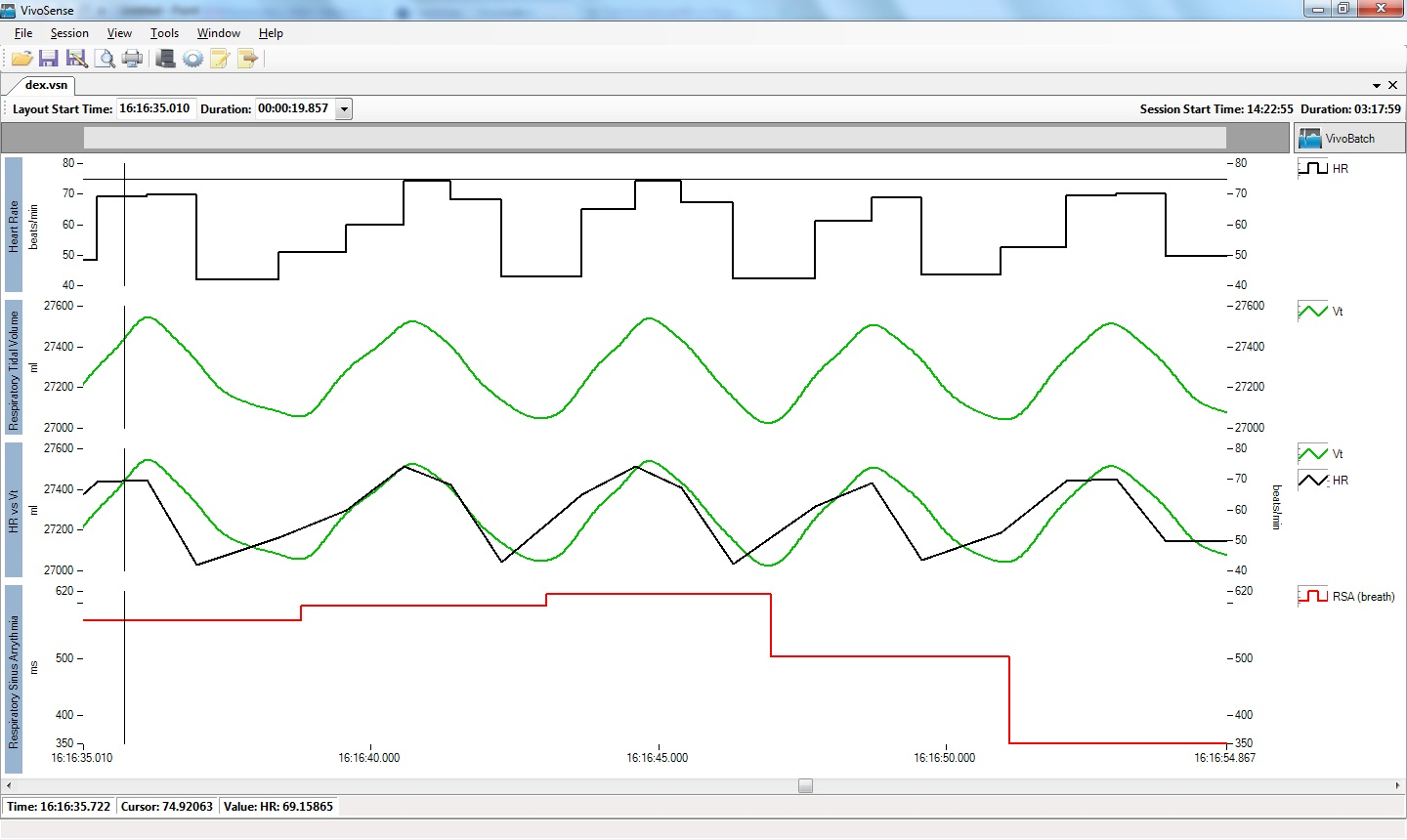
Heart rate (HR) (top trace) and tidal volume (Vt) (lung volume, second trace) plotted on the same chart, showing how heart rate increases with inspiration and decreases with expiration.

Heart rate is not a stable value and it increases or decreases in response to the body's need in a way to maintain an equilibrium (basal metabolic rate) between requirement and delivery of oxygen and nutrients. The normal SA node firing rate is affected by autonomic nervous system activity: sympathetic stimulation increases and parasympathetic stimulation decreases the firing rate.

=== Resting heart rate ===
Normal pulse rates at rest, in beats per minute (BPM):

Resting heart rate recorded in an elite athlete demonstrating bradycardia at 42 bpm

Infant heartbeat
Infant heartbeat

Newborns (0–1 months old)	Infants (1–11 months)	Children (1–2 years old)	Children (3–4 years)	Children (5–6 years)	Children (7–9 years)	Children over 10 years and adults, including seniors	Well-trained adult athletes
70–190	80–160	80–130	80–120	75–115	70–110	60–100	40–60

The basal or resting heart rate (HR_{rest}) is defined as the heart rate when a person is awake, in a neutrally temperate environment, and has not been subject to any recent exertion or stimulation, such as stress or surprise. The normal resting heart rate is based on the at-rest firing rate of the heart's sinoatrial node, where the faster pacemaker cells driving the self-generated rhythmic firing and responsible for the heart's autorhythmicity are located.

In one 1993 study, 98% of cardiologists suggested that as a desirable target range, 50 to 90 beats per minute is more appropriate than 60 to 100. The available evidence indicates that the normal range for resting heart rate is 50–90 beats per minute (bpm). In a study of over 35,000 American men and women over age 40 during the 1999–2008 period, 71 bpm was the average for men, and 73 bpm was the average for women.

Resting heart rate is often correlated with mortality. In the Copenhagen City Heart Study a heart rate of 65 bpm rather than 80 bpm was associated with 4.6 years longer life expectancy in men and 3.6 years in women. Other studies have shown all-cause mortality is increased by 1.22 (hazard ratio) when heart rate exceeds 90 beats per minute. ECG of 46,129 individuals with low risk for cardiovascular disease revealed that 96% had resting heart rates ranging from 48 to 98 beats per minute. The mortality rate of patients with myocardial infarction increased from 15% to 41% if their admission heart rate was greater than 90 beats per minute. For endurance athletes at the elite level, it is not unusual to have a resting heart rate between 33 and 50 bpm.

=== Maximum heart rate ===
An elite athlete's heart recorded during a maximum effort workout maintaining over 180 bpm for 10 minutes.

The maximum heart rate (HR_{max}) is the age-related highest number of beats per minute of the heart when reaching a point of exhaustion without severe problems through exercise stress. In general it is loosely estimated as 220 minus one's age. The maximum heart rate decreases with aging regardless of fitness, gender or diet. Since HR_{max} varies by individual, the most accurate way of measuring any single person's HR_{max} is via a cardiac stress test. In this test, a person is subjected to controlled physiologic stress (generally by treadmill or bicycle ergometer) while being monitored by an electrocardiogram (ECG). The intensity of exercise is periodically increased until certain changes in heart function are detected on the ECG monitor, at which point the subject is directed to stop. Typical duration of the test ranges ten to twenty minutes. Adults who are beginning a new exercise regimen are often advised to perform this test only in the presence of medical staff due to risks associated with high heart rates.

The theoretical maximum heart rate of a human is 300 bpm; however, there have been multiple cases where this theoretical upper limit has been exceeded. The fastest human ventricular conduction rate recorded to this day is a conducted tachyarrhythmia with ventricular rate of 600 beats per minute, which is comparable to the heart rate of a mouse.

For general purposes, a number of formulas are used to estimate HR_{max}. However, these predictive formulas have been criticized as inaccurate because they only produce generalized population-averages and may deviate significantly from the actual value. (See § Limitations.)

Formulas for estimating HR_{max}
Name	Data	HR_{max} Formula	Error
Haskell & Fox (1971)	35 data points	220 − age	SD = 12–15 bpm
Inbar, et al. (1994)	1424 men	205.8 − (0.685 × age)	SD = 6.4 bpm
Tanaka, Monahan, & Seals (2001)	315 studies, 514 individuals	208 − (0.7 × age)	SD ~10 bpm
Wohlfart, B. and Farazdaghi, G.R.	81 men, 87 women	Men: 203.7 / ( 1 + exp( 0.033 × (age − 104.3) ) ) Women: 190.2 / ( 1 + exp( 0.0453 × (age − 107.5) ) )	SD = 6.5% men, 5.5% women
Oakland University (2007)	100 men, 32 women, 908 longitudinal observations	Linear: 207 − (0.7 × age); Nonlinear: 192 − (0.007 × age^{2})	1 SD confidence interval: ±5–8 bpm (linear), ±2–5 bpm (nonlinear)
Gulati (2010)	5437 women	Women: 206 − (0.88 × age)	SD = 11.8 bpm
Nes, et al. (2013)	1726 men, 1594 women	211 − (0.64 × age)	SEE = 10.8 bpm
Wingate (2015)	20,691 males, 7,446 females	Men: 208.609–0.716 × age Women: 209.273–0.804 × age	SD = 10.81 (male), 12.15 (female)

==== Haskell & Fox (1970) ====
Fox and Haskell formula; widely used

Notwithstanding later research, the most widely cited formula for HR_{max} is still:

HR_{max} = 220 − age

Although attributed to various sources, it is widely thought to have been devised in 1970 by Dr. William Haskell and Dr. Samuel Fox. They did not develop this formula from original research, but rather by plotting data from approximately 11 references consisting of published research or unpublished scientific compilations. It gained widespread use through being used by Polar Electro in its heart rate monitors, which Dr. Haskell has "laughed about", as the formula "was never supposed to be an absolute guide to rule people's training."

While this formula is commonly used (and easy to remember and calculate), research has consistently found that it is subject to bias, particularly in older adults. Compared to the age-specific average HR_{max}, the Haskell and Fox formula overestimates HR_{max} in young adults, agrees with it at age 40, and underestimates HR_{max} in older adults. For example, in one study, the average HR_{max} at age 76 was about 10bpm higher than the Haskell and Fox equation. Consequently, the formula cannot be recommended for use in exercise physiology and related fields.

==== Other formulas ====
The various formulae provide slightly different numbers for the maximum heart rates by age.

HR_{max} is strongly correlated to age, and most formulas are solely based on this. Studies have been mixed on the effect of gender, with some finding that gender is statistically significant, although small when considering overall equation error, while others finding negligible effect. The inclusion of physical activity status, maximal oxygen uptake, smoking, body mass index, body weight, or resting heart rate did not significantly improve accuracy. Nonlinear models are slightly more accurate predictors of average age-specific HR_{max}, particularly above 60 years of age, but are harder to apply, and provide statistically negligible improvement over linear models. The Wingate formula is the most recent, had the largest data set, and performed best on a fresh data set when compared with other formulas, although it had only a small amount of data for ages 60 and older so those estimates should be viewed with caution. In addition, most formulas are developed for adults and are not applicable to children and adolescents.

==== Limitations ====
Maximum heart rates vary significantly between individuals. Age explains only about half of HR_{max} variance. For a given age, the standard deviation of HR_{max} from the age-specific population mean is about 12bpm, and a 95% interval for the prediction error is about 24bpm. For example, Dr. Fritz Hagerman observed that the maximum heart rates of men in their 20s on Olympic rowing teams vary from 160 to 220. Such a variation would equate to an age range of -16 to 68 using the Wingate formula. The formulas are quite accurate at predicting the average heart rate of a group of similarly-aged individuals, but relatively poor for a given individual.

Robergs and Landwehr opine that for VO2 max, prediction errors in HR_{max} need to be less than ±3 bpm. No current formula meets this accuracy. For prescribing exercise training heart rate ranges, the errors in the more accurate formulas may be acceptable, but again it is likely that, for a significant fraction of the population, current equations used to estimate HR_{max} are not accurate enough. Froelicher and Myers describe maximum heart formulas as "largely useless". Measurement via a maximal test is preferable whenever possible, which can be as accurate as ±2bpm.

=== Heart rate reserve ===
Heart rate reserve (HR_{reserve}) is the difference between a person's measured or predicted maximum heart rate and resting heart rate, HR_{max} − HR_{rest}. As a person increases their cardiovascular fitness, their HR_{rest} will drop, and the heart rate reserve will increase.

=== Target heart rate ===
For healthy people, the Target Heart Rate (THR) or Training Heart Rate Range (THRR) is a desired heart rate reached during aerobic exercise which enables one's heart and lungs to receive the most benefit from a workout. In practice metrics such as heart rate and VO_{2} have significant individual variations in their relationship to exercise physiology, meaning a broad range is given for exercise prescription.

==== By percent, Fox–Haskell-based ====
The THR can be calculated as a range of 65–85% intensity, with intensity defined simply as percentage of HR_{max}.

Example for someone with a HR_{max} of 180 (age 40, estimating HR_{max} As 220 − age):

65% Intensity: (220 − (age = 40)) × 0.65 → 117 bpm
85% Intensity: (220 − (age = 40)) × 0.85 → 154 bpm

==== Karvonen method ====
The Karvonen method gauges exercise intensity as the percentage of heart rate reserve. It is named after Karvonen, author of the initial 1957 study. Karvonen's study used only six subjects, and Karvonen did not connect his recommendations to VO_{2} data, but later studies identified a connection. The percentage of heart rate reserve is strongly correlated with the percentage of VO2 max and the percentage of VO_{2} in reserve, but the correlation is not perfect.

As formulas:

% intensity = (THR - HR_{rest}) / (HR_{max} − HR_{rest})
THR = ((HR_{max} − HR_{rest}) × % intensity) + HR_{rest}

Equivalently,

% intensity = (THR - HR_{rest}) / HR_{reserve}
THR = (HR_{reserve} × % intensity) + HR_{rest}

Example for someone with a HR_{max} of 180 and a HR_{rest} of 70 (and therefore a HR_{reserve} of 110):

50% Intensity: ((180 − 70) × 0.50) + 70 = 125 bpm
85% Intensity: ((180 − 70) × 0.85) + 70 = 163 bpm

==== Zoladz method ====
An alternative to the Karvonen method is the Zoladz method, which is used to test an athlete's capabilities at specific heart rates. These are not intended to be used as exercise zones, although they are often used as such. The Zoladz test zones are derived by subtracting values from HR_{max}:

THR = HR_{max} − Adjuster ± 5 bpm

Zone 1 Adjuster = 50 bpm
Zone 2 Adjuster = 40 bpm
Zone 3 Adjuster = 30 bpm
Zone 4 Adjuster = 20 bpm
Zone 5 Adjuster = 10 bpm

Example for someone with a HR_{max} of 180:

Zone 1 (easy exercise): 180 − 50 ± 5 → 125 − 135 bpm
Zone 4 (tough exercise): 180 − 20 ± 5 → 155 − 165 bpm

=== Heart rate recovery ===
Heart rate recovery (HRR) is the reduction in heart rate at peak exercise and the rate as measured after a cool-down period of fixed duration. A greater reduction in heart rate after exercise during the reference period is associated with a higher level of cardiac fitness.

Heart rates assessed during treadmill stress test that do not drop by more than 12 bpm one minute after stopping exercise (if cool-down period after exercise) or by more than 18 bpm one minute after stopping exercise (if no cool-down period and supine position as soon as possible) are associated with an increased risk of death. People with an abnormal HRR defined as a decrease of 42 beats per minutes or less at two minutes post-exercise had a mortality rate 2.5 times greater than patients with a normal recovery. Another study reported a four-fold increase in mortality in subjects with an abnormal HRR defined as ≤12 bpm reduction one minute after the cessation of exercise. A study reported that a HRR of ≤22 bpm after two minutes "best identified high-risk patients". They also found that while HRR had significant prognostic value it had no diagnostic value.

=== Heart rate prediction ===
Heart rate prediction using machine learning has gained significant attention in health monitoring and sports performance research. Namazi et.al., 2025 study evaluated various models including Long Short-Term Memory (LSTM), Physics-Informed Neural Networks (PINNs), and 1D Convolutional Neural Networks (1D CNNs), using physiological data such as heart rate (HR), breathing rate (BR), and RR intervals collected from wearable sensors during sports activities. The study introduced a hybrid approach combining Singular Spectrum Analysis (SSA) with these models to enhance predictive performance. Among the tested models, the SSA-LSTM method yielded the lowest prediction error, particularly when multivariate inputs (HR + BR + RR) were used. These findings support the use of AI-driven, multivariate prediction models for real-time cardiovascular monitoring in athletic and healthcare settings.

=== Development ===
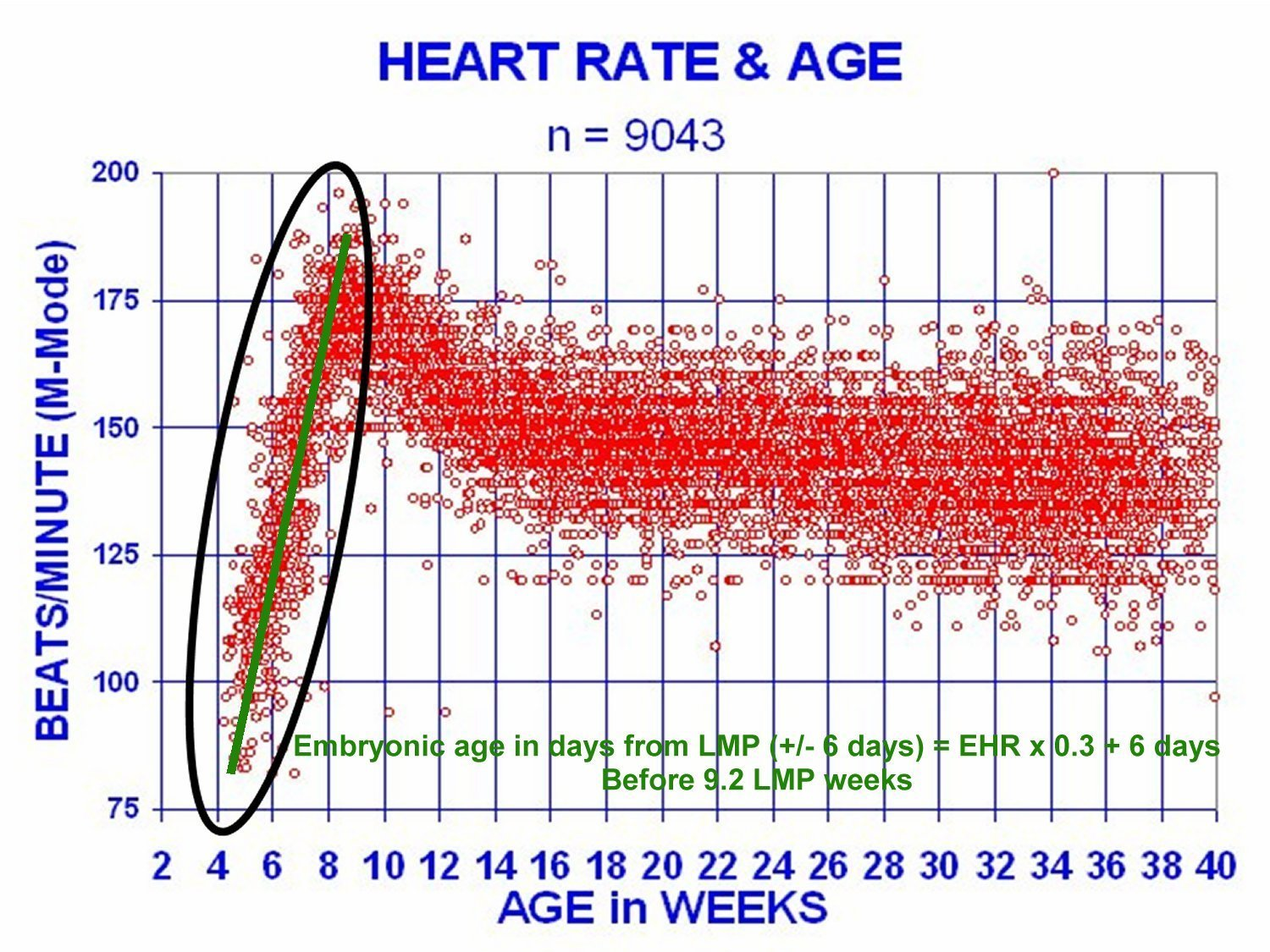
At 21 days after conception, the human heart begins beating at 70 to 80 beats per minute and accelerates linearly for the first month of beating.

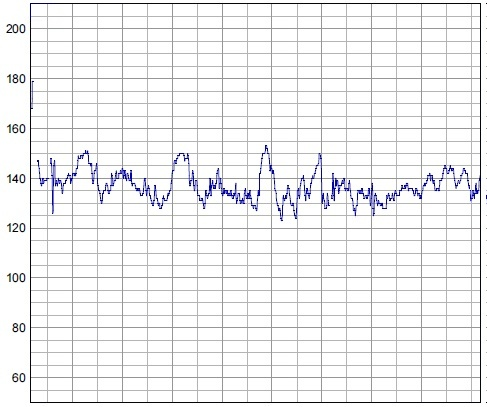
Fetal heart rate monitoring. 30 weeks pregnancy.

The human heart beats more than 2.8 billion times in an average lifetime. The heartbeat of a human embryo begins at approximately 21 days after conception, or five weeks after the last normal menstrual period (LMP), which is the date normally used to date pregnancy in the medical community. The electrical depolarizations that trigger cardiac myocytes to contract arise spontaneously within the myocyte itself. The heartbeat is initiated in the pacemaker regions and spreads to the rest of the heart through a conduction pathway. Pacemaker cells develop in the primitive atrium and the sinus venosus to form the sinoatrial node and the atrioventricular node respectively. Conductive cells develop the bundle of His and carry the depolarization into the lower heart.

The human heart begins beating at a rate near the mother's, about 75–80 beats per minute (bpm). The embryonic heart rate then accelerates linearly for the first month of beating, peaking at 165–185 bpm during the early 7th week, (early 9th week after the LMP). This acceleration is approximately 3.3 bpm per day, or about 10 bpm every three days, an increase of 100 bpm in the first month.

After peaking at about 9.2 weeks after the LMP, it decelerates to about 150 bpm (+/-25 bpm) during the 15th week after the LMP. After the 15th week the deceleration slows reaching an average rate of about 145 (+/-25 bpm) bpm at term. The regression formula which describes this acceleration before the embryo reaches 25 mm in crown-rump length or 9.2 LMP weeks is:

$\mathrm{Age\ in\ days} =\ \mathrm{EHR} (0.3)+6$

== Clinical significance ==
=== Manual measurement ===
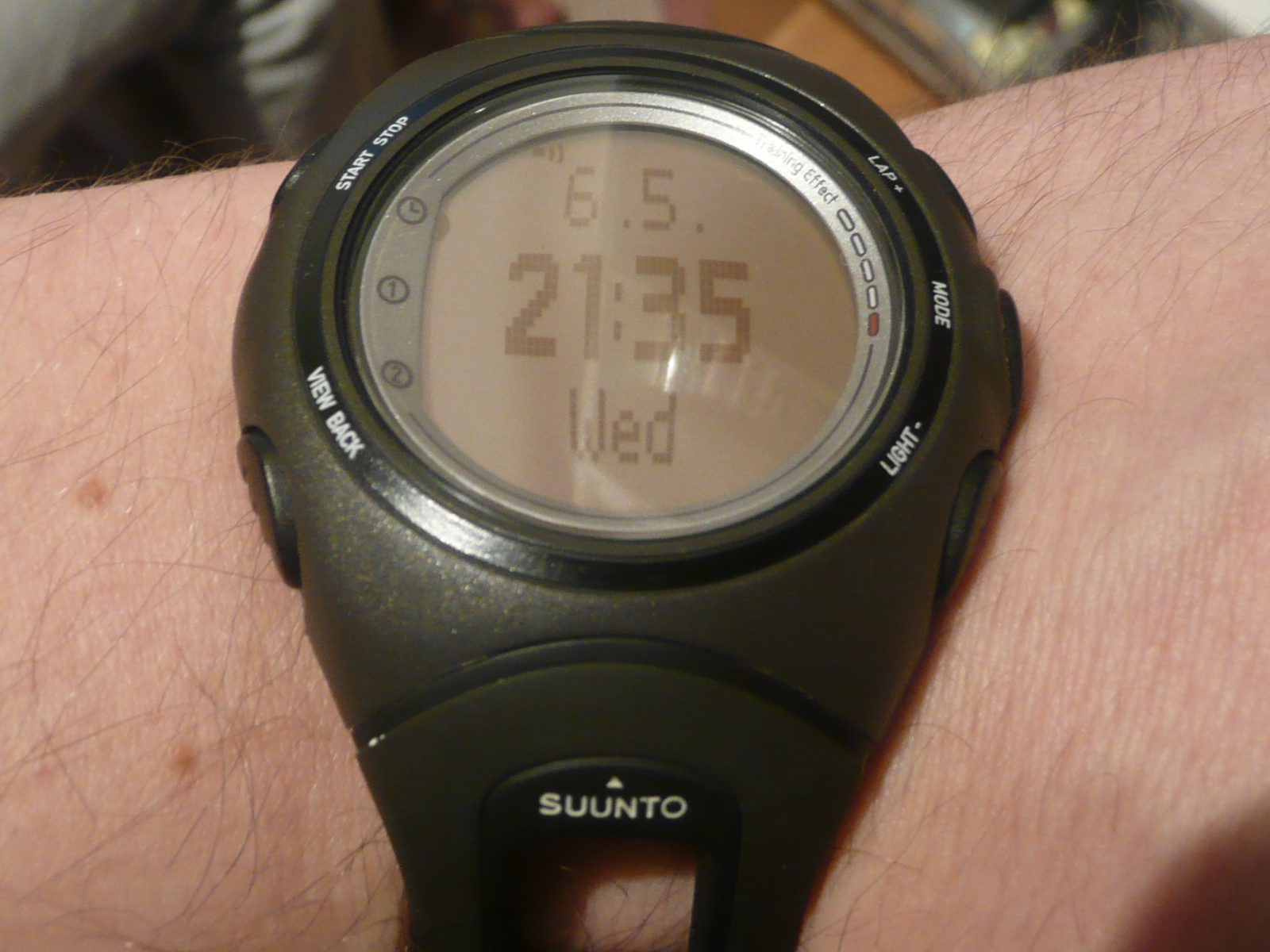
Wrist heart rate monitor (2009)

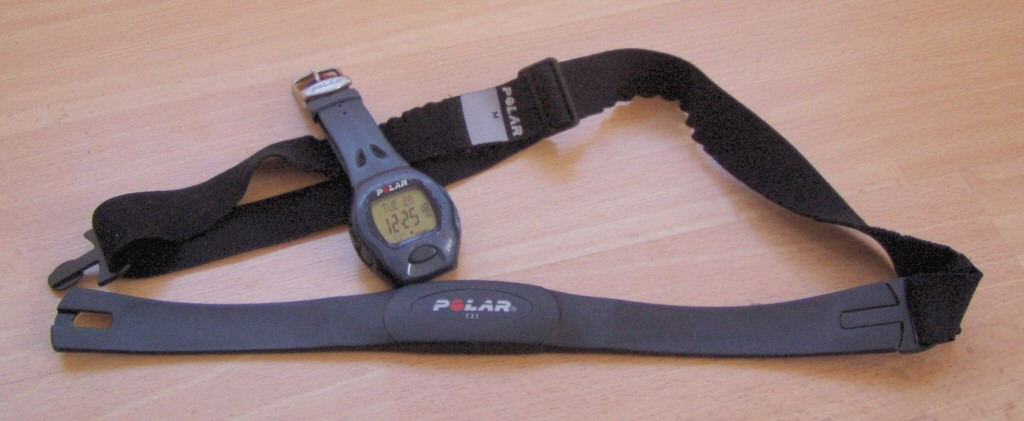
Heart rate monitor with a wrist receiver

Heart rate is measured by finding the pulse of the heart. This pulse rate can be found at any point on the body where the artery's pulsation is transmitted to the surface by pressuring it with the index and middle fingers; often it is compressed against an underlying structure like bone. The thumb should not be used for measuring another person's heart rate, as its strong pulse may interfere with the correct perception of the target pulse.

The radial artery is the easiest to use to check the heart rate. However, in emergency situations the most reliable arteries to measure heart rate are carotid arteries. This is important mainly in patients with atrial fibrillation, in whom heart beats are irregular and stroke volume is largely different from one beat to another. In those beats following a shorter diastolic interval left ventricle does not fill properly, stroke volume is lower and pulse wave is not strong enough to be detected by palpation on a distal artery like the radial artery. It can be detected, however, by doppler.

Possible points for measuring the heart rate are:

1. The ventral aspect of the wrist on the side of the thumb (radial artery).
2. The ulnar artery.
3. The inside of the elbow, or under the biceps muscle (brachial artery).
4. The groin (femoral artery).
5. Behind the medial malleolus on the feet (posterior tibial artery).
6. Middle of dorsum of the foot (dorsalis pedis).
7. Behind the knee (popliteal artery).
8. Over the abdomen (abdominal aorta).
9. The chest (apex of the heart), which can be felt with one's hand or fingers. It is also possible to auscultate the heart using a stethoscope.
10. In the neck, lateral of the larynx (carotid artery)
11. The temple (superficial temporal artery).
12. The lateral edge of the mandible (facial artery).
13. The side of the head near the ear (posterior auricular artery).

ECG-RRinterval

=== Electronic measurement ===
In obstetrics, heart rate can be measured by ultrasonography, such as in this embryo (at bottom left in the sac) of 6 weeks with a heart rate of approximately 90 per minute.

A more precise method of determining heart rate involves the use of an electrocardiograph, or ECG (also abbreviated EKG). An ECG generates a pattern based on electrical activity of the heart, which closely follows heart function. Continuous ECG monitoring is routinely done in many clinical settings, especially in critical care medicine. On the ECG, instantaneous heart rate is calculated using the R wave-to-R wave (RR) interval and multiplying/dividing in order to derive heart rate in heartbeats/min. Multiple methods exist:

- HR = 1000 · 60/(RR interval in milliseconds)
- HR = 60/(RR interval in seconds)
- HR = 300/number of "large" squares between successive R waves.
- HR = 1,500 number of large blocks

Heart rate monitors allow measurements to be taken continuously and can be used during exercise when manual measurement would be difficult or impossible (such as when the hands are being used). Various commercial heart rate monitors are also available. Some monitors, used during sport, consist of a chest strap with electrodes. The signal is transmitted to a wrist receiver for display.

Alternative methods of measurement include seismocardiography.

=== Optical measurements ===
Pulsatile retinal blood flow in the optic nerve head region revealed by laser Doppler imaging

Pulse oximetry of the finger and laser Doppler imaging of the eye fundus are often used in the clinics. Those techniques can assess the heart rate by measuring the delay between pulses.

=== Tachycardia ===
Tachycardia is a resting heart rate more than 100 beats per minute. This number can vary as smaller people and children have faster heart rates than average adults.

Physiological conditions where tachycardia occurs:

1. Pregnancy
2. Emotional conditions such as anxiety or stress.
3. Exercise

Pathological conditions where tachycardia occurs:

1. Sepsis
2. Fever
3. Anemia
4. Hypoxia
5. Hyperthyroidism
6. Hypersecretion of catecholamines
7. Cardiomyopathy
8. Valvular heart diseases
9. Acute Radiation Syndrome
10. Dehydration
11. Metabolic myopathies (At rest, tachycardia is commonly seen in fatty acid oxidation disorders. An inappropriate rapid heart rate response to exercise is seen in muscle glycogenoses and mitochondrial myopathies, where the tachycardia is faster than would be expected during exercise).

=== Bradycardia ===
Bradycardia was defined as a heart rate less than 60 beats per minute when textbooks asserted that the normal range for heart rates was 60–100 bpm. The normal range has since been revised in textbooks to 50–90 bpm for a human at total rest. Setting a lower threshold for bradycardia prevents misclassification of fit individuals as having a pathologic heart rate. The normal heart rate number can vary as children and adolescents tend to have faster heart rates than average adults. Bradycardia may be associated with medical conditions such as hypothyroidism, heart disease, or inflammatory disease. At rest, although tachycardia is more commonly seen in fatty acid oxidation disorders, more rarely acute bradycardia can occur.

Trained athletes tend to have slow resting heart rates, and resting bradycardia in athletes should not be considered abnormal if the individual has no symptoms associated with it. For example, Miguel Indurain, a Spanish cyclist and five time Tour de France winner, had a resting heart rate of 28 beats per minute, one of the lowest ever recorded in a healthy human. Daniel Green achieved the world record for the slowest heartbeat in a healthy human with a heart rate of just 26 bpm in 2014.

=== Arrhythmia ===
Arrhythmias are abnormalities of the heart rate and rhythm (sometimes felt as palpitations). They can be divided into two broad categories: fast and slow heart rates. Some cause few or minimal symptoms. Others produce more serious symptoms of lightheadedness, dizziness and fainting.

=== Hypertension ===
Elevated heart rate is a powerful predictor of morbidity and mortality in patients with hypertension. Atherosclerosis and dysautonomia are major contributors to the pathogenesis.

=== Correlation with cardiovascular mortality risk ===
A number of investigations indicate that faster resting heart rate has emerged as a new risk factor for mortality in homeothermic mammals, particularly cardiovascular mortality in human beings. High heart rate is associated with endothelial dysfunction and increased atheromatous plaque formation leading to atherosclerosis. Faster heart rate may accompany increased production of inflammation molecules and increased production of reactive oxygen species in cardiovascular system, in addition to increased mechanical stress to the heart. There is a correlation between increased resting rate and cardiovascular risk. This is not seen to be "using an allotment of heart beats" but rather an increased risk to the system from the increased rate.

An Australian-led international study of patients with cardiovascular disease has shown that heart beat rate is a key indicator for the risk of heart attack. The study, published in The Lancet (September 2008) studied 11,000 people, across 33 countries, who were being treated for heart problems. Those patients whose heart rate was above 70 beats per minute had significantly higher incidence of heart attacks, hospital admissions and the need for surgery. Higher heart rate is thought to be correlated with an increase in heart attack and about a 46 percent increase in hospitalizations for non-fatal or fatal heart attack.

Other studies have shown that a high resting heart rate is associated with an increase in cardiovascular and all-cause mortality in the general population and in patients with chronic diseases. A faster resting heart rate is associated with shorter life expectancy and is considered a strong risk factor for heart disease and heart failure, independent of level of physical fitness. Specifically, a resting heart rate above 65 beats per minute has been shown to have a strong independent effect on premature mortality; every 10 beats per minute increase in resting heart rate has been shown to be associated with a 10–20% increase in risk of death. In one study, men with no evidence of heart disease and a resting heart rate of more than 90 beats per minute had a five times higher risk of sudden cardiac death. Similarly, another study found that men with resting heart rates of over 90 beats per minute had an almost two-fold increase in risk for cardiovascular disease mortality; in women it was associated with a three-fold increase. In patients having heart rates of 70 beats/minute or above, each additional beat/minute was associated with increased rate of cardiovascular death and heart failure hospitalization.

Given these data, heart rate should be considered in the assessment of cardiovascular risk, even in apparently healthy individuals. Heart rate has many advantages as a clinical parameter: It is inexpensive and quick to measure and is easily understandable. Although the accepted limits of heart rate are between 60 and 100 beats per minute, this was based for convenience on the scale of the squares on electrocardiogram paper; a better definition of normal sinus heart rate may be between 50 and 90 beats per minute.

Standard textbooks of physiology and medicine mention that heart rate (HR) is readily calculated from the ECG as follows: HR = 1000*60/RR interval in milliseconds, HR = 60/RR interval in seconds, or HR = 300/number of large squares between successive R waves. In each case, the authors are actually referring to instantaneous HR, which is the number of times the heart would beat if successive RR intervals were constant.

Lifestyle and pharmacological regimens may be beneficial to those with high resting heart rates. Exercise is one possible measure to take when an individual's heart rate is higher than 80 beats per minute. Diet has also been found to be beneficial in lowering resting heart rate: In studies of resting heart rate and risk of death and cardiac complications on patients with type 2 diabetes, legumes were found to lower resting heart rate. This is thought to occur because in addition to the direct beneficial effects of legumes, they also displace animal proteins in the diet, which are higher in saturated fat and cholesterol. Another nutrient is omega-3 long chain polyunsaturated fatty acids (omega-3 fatty acid or LC-PUFA). In a meta-analysis with a total of 51 randomized controlled trials (RCTs) involving 3,000 participants, the supplement mildly but significantly reduced heart rate (-2.23 bpm; 95% CI: -3.07, -1.40 bpm). When docosahexaenoic acid (DHA) and eicosapentaenoic acid (EPA) were compared, modest heart rate reduction was observed in trials that supplemented with DHA (-2.47 bpm; 95% CI: -3.47, -1.46 bpm), but not in those received EPA.

A very slow heart rate (bradycardia) may be associated with heart block. It may also arise from autonomous nervous system impairment.

== See also ==
- Heart rate monitor
- Cardiac cycle
- Electrocardiography
- Sinus rhythm
- Second wind (heart rate is measured during 12 Minute Walk Test)
- Bainbridge reflex

== Bibliography ==
- Fuster V, Wayne AR, O'Rouke RA (2001). Hurst's The Heart (10th International ed.). New York: McGraw-Hill. ISBN 978-0-07-116296-8. OCLC 49034333.
- Jarvis, C. (2011). Physical Examination and Health Assessment (6 ed.). Saunders Elsevier. ISBN 978-1-4377-0151-7.
