= Accelerator nerve =

Sympathetic nerve to the heart

Accelerator nerves are cardiopulmonary splanchnic nerves that allow the sympathetic nervous system's stimulation of the heart. They originate from the ganglion cells of the superior, middle, and inferior cervical ganglion of the sympathetic trunk. The accelerator nerves increase the heart rate. They cause the heart to beat with more force, which then increases blood pressure.

While accelerator nerves increase the heart rate which then increases blood pressure, the accelerans nerve speeds it up by emitting noradrenaline. This results in an increased bloodflow.

Accelerator nerves also play an important role in controlling heart rate in birds.
