= Accelerans nerve =

Accelerans nerve forms a part of the sympathetic branch of the autonomic nervous system, and its function is to release noradrenaline at its endings on the heart. The heart beats according to a rhythm set up by the sinoatrial node or pacemaker, which is located on the right atrium of the heart. It is acted on by the nervous system, as well as hormones in the blood, and venous return: the amount of blood being returned to the heart. The two nerves acting on the heart are the vagus nerve, which slows heart rate down by emitting acetylcholine, and the accelerans nerve which speeds it up by emitting noradrenaline. This results in an increased blood flow, preparing the body for a sudden increase in activity. These nerve fibres are part of the autonomic nervous system, part of the 'fight or flight' system.

Right where the sinoatrial node is, the negative charge of the interior of the fibres of heart muscles breaks down spontaneously the cells in the pacemaker about 70 minutes each time. As a result of this, a small current sweeps over the atria, which then reaches the insulating connective tissue between the atria and ventricles. When the current reaches this part, the atrio-ventricular node picks it up, thus creating the rhythm of the heartbeats through the rate and strength of each palpitation which is controlled by the accelerans nerve.

== History and etymology ==
The accelerans nerve was first discovered on April 23, 1883 by German medical students L.C. Wooldridge, D.S and George Henry Lewes, M.B. Both medical students conducted their investigation in the Physiological Institute of Leipzig. The purpose of the investigation which yielded the finding of the accelerans nerve was to learn more about the function of the nerves which can be observed in the surface of the ventricles of mammalian hearts. In their findings, both researches saw that there was an increase in cardiovascular acceleration due to stimulation of the accelerans nerve found in the ventricles of the mammals they studied. In Aug 1950, medical researcher O. Krayer confirmed that through electrical stimulations of the accelerans nerve, the force of heart palpitations could be increased which increases blood flow throughout the body, rightly solidifying the importance of this nerve as well as what its manipulation could lead to. More recently, on 24 Feb 2000, the New England Journal of Medicine released a study which revealed the existence of a mutant gene that leads to the development of a transporter that is in charge of the reuptake of noradrenaline back to the accelerans nerve.

The term accelerans comes from the latin word accelerrō which means "quickening" or "to hasten". The term nerve comes from the latin words nervus which meant sinew or tendon in an animal body.

== Measurements in mammals ==
The majority of research regarding the accelerans nerve has been centered around other mammals part from humans. The first study ever conducted on accelerans nerve on April 23, 1883 necessitated other mammals apart from humans, not only due to ethical concerns, but in order to visualize the difference in their stimulation depending on the mammal. The following is a list of mammals who have been used for research into the accelerans nerve and what results were found from the studies:

=== Dogs ===
In the case of dogs, the first case ever mentioned regarding the accelerans nerve and its function in 1883 yielded that the investigation in dogs was done almost exclusively on the right side of the nerves. The reason for this was that researches saw that any sort of stimulation on the left side showed no significant impact to the rhythm of the heart. Also, the researchers observed that even after death, any manipulation of the accelerans nerve, or any other neighbouring nerves, caused a reflex movement from the dogs, underlying the significance of its function in the heart. Furthermore, one study conducted in January 1988 found that even through chronic administration of betaxolol (1 mg kg-1 daily, s.c.) for 7 days, which is a drug used to relax blood vessels and slowing down heart rate, in vivo stimulation of the accelerans nerve demonstrated a significant increase in the production of noradrenaline. These results indicated that in medical situations in which the rate and strength of a patient's heartbeats reaches critically low levels, stimulation of the accelerans nerve allows for a more expeditious way to gain the heart's vitality back, analogous to the function of artificial pacemakers.

=== Cats ===
In the case of cats, stimulation of the accelerans nerve was found to produce a much more significant effect on their heart rates compared to the hormones secreted by the adrenals glands in the autonomic nervous system for the fight-or-flight response. Moreover, the vigorous heart palpitations induced by the accelerans nerve in the hearts of cats seem to disappear quickly after a low-frequency stimulation is applied to the nerves. This quick shift in the heart rate resulted in the idea that decreases of stroke volume in humans requires direct vagal control of the heart ventricles.

=== Rabbit ===
In the case of rabbits, a study conducted in December 1973 directly administered certain substances to slow down the heart rate ranging from fentanyl to morphine (at concentrations of 10-100μM) in order to observe the heart's natural secretion of noradrenaline in the case of critically low heart rates. Every single drug given to the rabbits, except for naloxone, led to a diminished amount of neuronal uptake of noradrenaline. However, researchers observed that all the substances administered directly into the rabbits' hearts led to an increase in the secretion of noradrenaline due to the stimulation of the accelerans nerve by 5 hertz. In another case, it was observed that acidic substances, specifically acetic acid, when exposed to the accelerans nerve in rabbit hearts led to an increase in blood pressure due to the nerve's reaction with the acid which made it send out stronger signals.

== See also ==
- Atrioventricular Node
- Noradrenaline
- Accelerator Nerves
- Ventricles
- Sinoatrial Node
- Pacemaker
- Acetylcholine
- Vagus Nerve
